= GenX (disambiguation) =

GenX is a chemical process for producing Teflon and related chemicals, also used to refer to those chemicals.

GenX may also refer to:

- GenX, an open source capacity expansion energy system model
- General Electric GEnx, an aircraft engine
- Tata GenX Nano, an Indian compact car
- Generation X

== See also ==
- Gen X (disambiguation)
