= GridSpice =

Open source cloud-based simulation package

GridSpice is an open source cloud-based simulation package for the smart grid and incorporates code from MATPOWER and GridLAB-D. GridSpice models the interactions between all parts of the electrical grid including generation, transmission, distribution, storage and loads. GridSpace is free software released under the 3-clause BSD license.

== See also ==
- GridLAB-D
- Open energy system models – listing a number of open source electricity and energy system modeling projects
