= Joseph DeCarolis =

American scientist

Professor Joseph F. DeCarolis
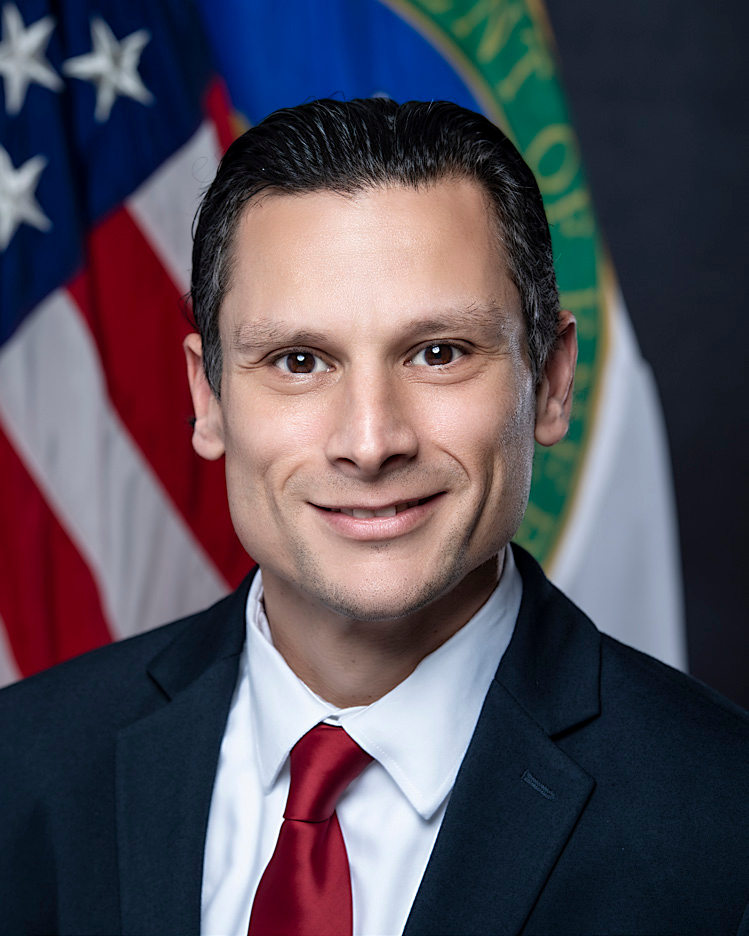
- Education: Clark University (BS); Carnegie Mellon University (PhD)
- Scientific career
- Fields: Energy systems analysis
- Institutions: Carnegie Mellon University; Duke University; North Carolina State University

Joseph F. DeCarolis is an American scientist and academic who had served as the administrator of the Energy Information Administration (EIA) in the Biden administration. His nomination was sent to the United States Senate for consideration on October 4, 2021, and confirmed on March 31, 2022. In 2025, DeCarolis left the EIA and took up a professorship in Engineering and Public Policy at Carnegie Mellon University.

== Education ==
DeCarolis earned a Bachelor of Science degree in physics and environmental science and policy from Clark University, followed by a PhD in engineering and public policy from Carnegie Mellon University.

== Career ==
From 2004 to 2008, DeCarolis served as an environmental scientist in the United States Environmental Protection Agency. From 2005 to 2008, he was also a part-time instructor at Duke University. He joined the faculty of North Carolina State University in 2008 as an associate professor and has since worked as a full professor. DeCarolis specializes in civil engineering, energy systems, and public policy.

=== Appointment to Department of Energy ===
On 22 September 2021, President Joe Biden nominated DeCarolis to be the administrator of the Energy Information Administration. His initial nomination was returned without hearings held on his nomination on 3 January 2022. President Biden renominated DeCarolis the following day and hearings were held for his nomination by the Senate's Energy Committee on 8 February 2022.

=== Professorship at Carnegie Mellon University ===
DeCarolis was appointed professor and head the Department of Engineering and Public Policy at Carnegie Mellon University, starting November 2025.

== See also ==
- TEMOA — Tools for Energy Model Optimization and Analysis, an open source energy system modeling framework
