= Gen X (disambiguation) =

Gen X usually refers to Generation X, the demographic coming after baby boomers but preceding Millennials.

Gen X may also refer to:

- Abbreviation for Generation X (comics)
- Working title of Gen^{13}
- Generation X (band), the punk band where Billy Idol got his break.
- GNX, commonly pronounced "Gen X", is the sixth album release by rap artist Kendrick Lamar

== See also ==
- GenX (disambiguation)
