= HiGHS optimization solver =

Numerical software

HiGHS
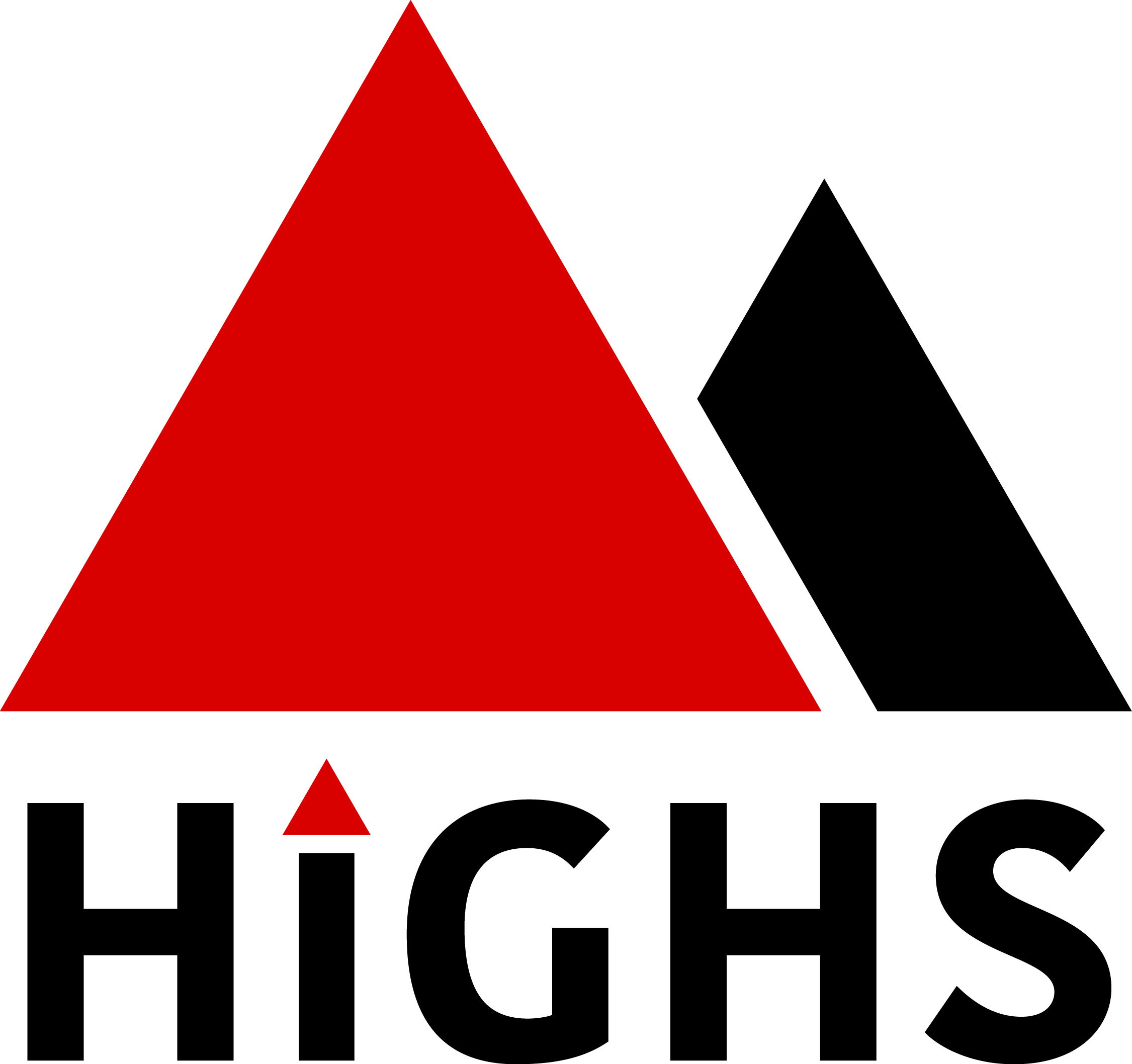
- Headquarters: Edinburgh
- Location: United Kingdom
- Director: Julian Hall
- Key people: Ivet Galabova
- Staff: 8
- Website: www.highs.dev

HiGHS
- Stable release: see release log
- Written in: C++
- Type: Optimization solver suite
- License: MIT
- Website: www.highs.dev
- Repository: github.com/ERGO-Code/HiGHS

HiGHS is open-source software to solve linear programming (LP), mixed-integer programming (MIP), and convex quadratic programming (QP) models.

Written in C++ and published under an MIT license, HiGHS provides programming interfaces to C, Python, Julia, Rust, R, JavaScript, Fortran, and C#. It has no external dependencies. A convenient thin wrapper to Python is available via the highspy PyPI package. HiGHS is also callable via NuGet.

Although generally single-threaded, some solver components can utilize multi-core architectures and, from Version 1.10.0, can run its first order LP solver on NVIDIA GPUs. HiGHS is designed to solve large-scale models and exploits problem sparsity. Its performance relative to commercial and other open-source software is reviewed periodically using industry-standard benchmarks.

The term HiGHS may also refer to both the underlying project and the small team leading the software development.

== History ==
HiGHS is based on solvers written by PhD students from the Optimization and Operational Research Group in the School of Mathematics at the University of Edinburgh. Its origins can be traced back to late 2016, when Ivet Galabova combined her LP presolve with Julian Hall's simplex crash procedure and Huangfu Qi's dual simplex solver to solve a class of industrial LP problems faster than the best open-source solvers at that time. Since then, a C++ API and other language interfaces have been developed, and modelling utilities and other categories of solver have been added.

In early‑2022, the GenX and PyPSA open energy system modelling projects endorsed a funding application for the HiGHS solver in an effort to reduce their community reliance on proprietary libraries.

== Solvers ==
=== Simplex ===
HiGHS has implementations of the primal and dual revised simplex method for solving LP problems, based on techniques described by Hall and McKinnon (2005), and Huangfu and Hall (2015, 2018). These include the exploitation of hyper-sparsity when solving linear systems in the simplex implementations and, for the dual simplex solver, exploitation of multi-threading. The simplex solver's performance relative to commercial and other open-source software is regularly reported using industry-standard benchmarks.

=== Interior point ===
HiGHS has an interior point method implementation for solving LP problems, based on techniques described by Schork and Gondzio (2020). It is notable for solving the Newton system iteratively by a preconditioned conjugate gradient method, rather than directly, via an LDL* decomposition. The interior point solver's performance relative to commercial and other open-source software is regularly reported using industry-standard benchmarks.

Version 1.12 saw the introduction of an interior point method implementation for solving LP problems, based on techniques described by Zanetti and Gondzio (2025). This optional feature is named HiPO and is dependent on the BLAS library.

=== Mixed integer programming ===
HiGHS has a branch-and-cut solver for MIP problems. Its performance relative to commercial and other open-source software is regularly reported using industry-standard benchmarks.

=== Quadratic programming ===
HiGHS has an active set solver for convex quadratic programming (QP) problems.

== Applications using HiGHS ==
HiGHS can be used as a stand‑alone solver library in bespoke applications, but numerical computing environments, optimization programming packages, and domain‑specific numerical analysis projects are starting to incorporate the software into their systems also.

=== Numerical computing support ===
As powerful open‑source software under active development, HiGHS is increasingly being adopted by application software projects that provide support for numerical analysis. The SciPy scientific library, for instance, uses HiGHS as its LP solver from release 1.6.0 and the HiGHS MIP solver for discrete optimization from release 1.9.0. As well as offering an interface to HiGHS, the JuMP modelling language for Julia also describes the specific use of HiGHS in its user documentation. The MIP solver in the NAG library is based on HiGHS , and HiGHS is the default LP and MIP solver in the MathWorks Optimization Toolbox .

=== Open energy system models ===
HiGHS is now also used by some domain‑specific applications, including one open energy system modeling environment. The web‑based version of the PyPSA European multi‑sector model deploys the HiGHS solver by default from February 2022. The GridCal project developing research‑oriented power systems software added optional support for HiGHS in February 2022. In early 2026, Open Energy Transition undertook some domain‑specific benchmarking.

== See also ==
- List of optimization software
- Mathematical optimization
- Numerical benchmarking
- Simplex method
