= Pvlib python =

Software for simulating solar power

pvlib python
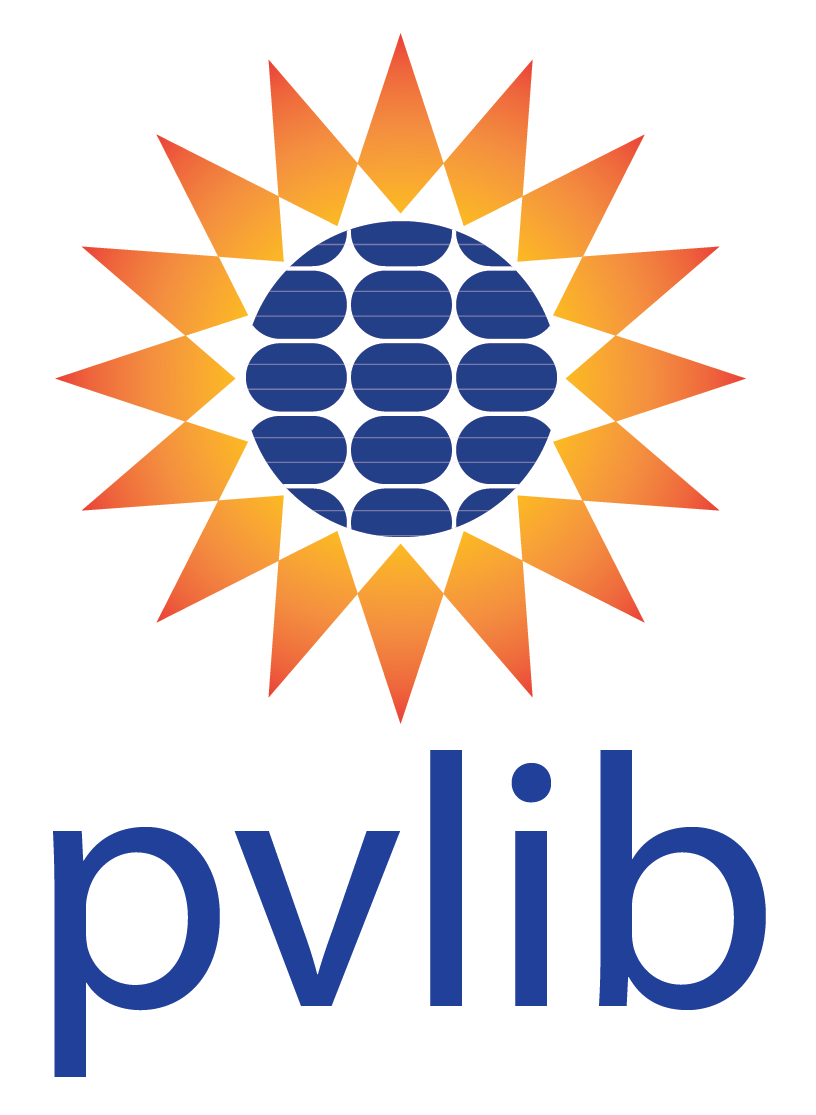
- Developer: Community project
- Release: 4 April 2015
- Stable release: 0.16.1 / 26 September 2026; 0 days ago
- Written in: Python
- Operating system: Cross-platform
- License: BSD
- Website: pvlib-python.readthedocs.io
- Repository: github.com/pvlib/pvlib-python

pvlib python is open source software for simulating solar power of photovoltaic energy systems.

== History ==
pvlib python is based on PV_LIB MATLAB which was originally developed in 2012 at Sandia National Laboratories as part of the PV Performance Modeling Collaborative (PVPMC) by researchers Josh Stein, Cliff Hansen, and Daniel Riley. In August 2013, Rob Andrews made the first open source commit on GitHub and began porting the MATLAB version to Python. Later he was joined by William Holmgren and Tony Lorenzo who completed the migration and released the first version to the Python Package Index (PyPI) on April 20, 2015. Since then there have been over 10 major releases. pvlib python has been joined by over 150 contributors, has been starred and forked on GitHub over 1000 times, and its Journal of Open Source Software (JOSS) paper has been cited over 1000 times. pvlib python is designated as a "critical project" on the PyPI, meaning it is in the top 1% of the package index by download count.

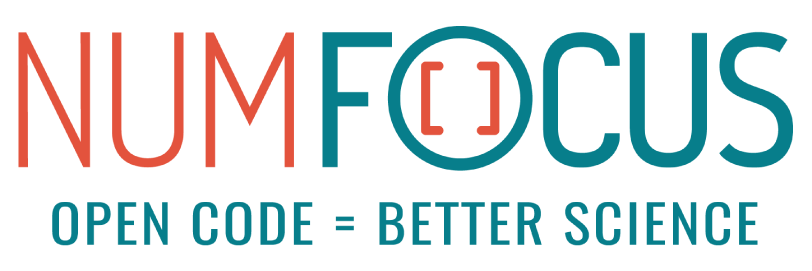
NumFOCUS

In 2019, pvlib python became an Affiliated Project with NumFOCUS. In 2021, pvlib python participated under the NumFOCUS umbrella GSoC application with a project to add more solar resource data. pvlib python has also been awarded NumFOCUS small development grants for adding battery energy storage system (BESS) functionality (2021), infrastructure for user group tutorials (2022), and new irradiance simulation functionality (2023).

== Functionality ==
pvlib python's documentation is online and includes many theory topics, an intro tutorial, an example gallery, and an API reference. The software is broken down by the steps shown in the PVPMC modeling diagram.

1. irradiance and weather retrieval and solar position calculation
2. irradiance decomposition and transposition to the plane of the array
3. soiling and shading
4. cell temperature
5. conversion from irradiance to power
6. DC ohmic and electrical mismatch losses
7. max power point tracking
8. inverter efficiency
9. AC losses
10. long term degradation

== Installation and contributions ==
pvlib python can be installed directly from the PyPI or from conda-forge. The source code is maintained on GitHub and new contributors are welcome to post issues or create pull requests. There is also a forum for discussion and questions.

== Examples ==
pvlib python is organized into low level functions and high level classes that allow multiple approaches to solving typical PV problems.

=== Solar position ===
import pandas as pd
from pvlib.solarposition import get_solarposition

times = pd.date_range(start="2021-01-01", end="2021-02-01", freq="H", tz="EST")
solpos = get_solarposition(time=times, latitude=40.0, longitude=-80)

== In the news ==
- In episode #76 of the Talk Python podcast, Anna Schneider, co-founder of Watttime, shares how she used pvlib python among other tools to forecast PV production in realtime.
- pvlib python maintainer Mark Mikofski discussed pvlib's history and its role in the renewable energy industry in a Mouse vs. Python interview.
- In a workshop held by the United States Department of Energy's Solar Energy Technologies Office (a long-time supporter of pvlib python) on encouraging community contribution to open-source software projects, pvlib python was discussed as an example of having achieved a significant user base.
- In an interview with Solar Power Portal, Jeff Ressler, CEO of Clean Power Research, discussed how their products and customers benefit from using pvlib python.

== See also ==
- Open energy system models > Programming components
