= Wolfgang Ketter =

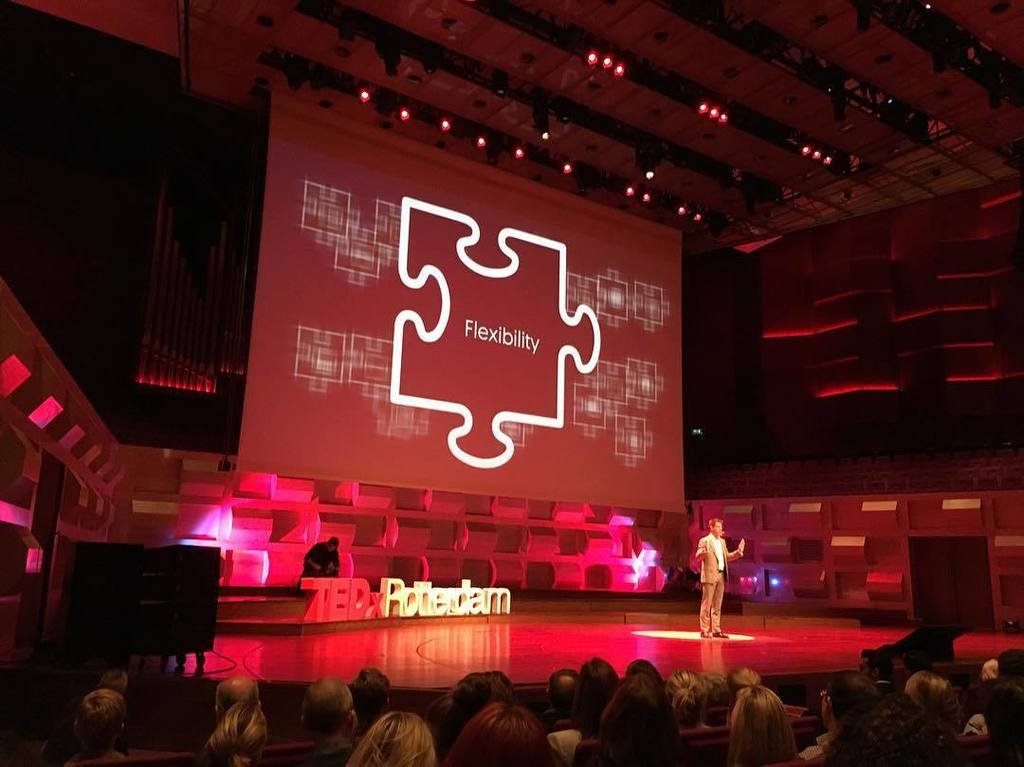
Professor Wolf Ketter delivering 'Sustainable Energy - without Fear' at the TedXRotterdam 2017 event

Wolfgang Ketter (born Traben-Trarbach, Germany, 1972) is Chaired Professor of Information Systems for a Sustainable Society at the University of Cologne. and a prominent scientist in the application of artificial intelligence, machine learning and intelligent agents in the design of smart markets, including demand response mechanisms and in particular automated auctions. He is a co-founder of the open energy system platform Power TAC, an automated retail electricity trading platform that simulates the performance of retail markets in an increasingly prosumer- and renewable-energy-influenced electricity landscape.

== Career ==
=== Advisory roles ===
Ketter is an advisor on the energy transition to the German government, in particular, the energy-intensive German state of North Rhine-Westphalia. He is also a fellow of the World Economic Forum and member of the WEF Global Council on Future Mobility and the Global New Mobility Coalition, contributing on the use of AI and machine learning to address issues arising from growth in electrification of energy such as the use of batteries as virtual power plants, the management of electric vehicle charging to prevent grid congestion, or the potential for peer-to-peer electricity trading.

Ketter has also been an advisor for over a decade to the Port of Rotterdam on the design of energy cooperatives and energy trading platforms as well as one of the largest auction companies in the world, Royal FloraHolland, where his initial research led to a redesign of auction mechanisms and decision support systems. The cumulative research project team received the Association for Information Systems Impact Award in 2020

=== Research ===
Ketter’s research is multidisciplinary, addressing the overlap of AI and ML in the economics of retail energy and mobility markets. The industry and policy applications of his research interconnect in large-scale projects such as the EU Smart city development project Ruggedised, for which the Erasmus University-based team's publication on the optimization of the City of Rotterdam's electric transit bus network was recognized with the Institute for Operations Research and the Management Sciences Daniel H. Wagner runner-up award.

His research focuses on the use of competitive benchmarking and intelligent agents in virtual world simulations of retail energy markets as part of a smart grid. A small-scale version of the Power TAC project led to a publication on demand side management, 'A simulation of household behavior under variable prices' that has several hundred citations in publications representing a variety of scientific disciplines. Two of his publications in the Management Information Systems Quarterly journal and one in Energy Economics form the foundation for the current Power TAC platform.

In 2016 and 2019 he was Chair of the Workshop on Information Technologies and Systems.

Ketter is Coordinator of the Key Research Initiative Sustainable Smart Energy & Mobility at the University of Cologne, where he is a chaired Professor of Information Systems for a Sustainable Society. At the Rotterdam School of Management, Erasmus University, he is Professor of Next Generation Information Systems as well as Director of the Erasmus Centre for Future Energy Business and Academic Director of Smart Cities and Smart Energy at the Erasmus Centre of Data Analytics. He has been a visiting professor at the Haas School of Business and Berkeley Institute of Data Science, University of California at Berkeley in 2016 to 2017.
