= JuMP =

Programming language

- Developers: Miles Lubin; Benoît Legat; Joaquim Dias Garcia; Joey Huchette; Oscar Dowson
- First appeared: 2013; 12 years ago
- Stable release: 1.26.0 / May 21, 2025; 51 days ago
- Implementation language: Julia
- OS: Cross-platform: Linux, Mac OS X and Windows
- License: Mozilla MPL‑2.0 (JuMP), MIT (supporting packages)
- Website: jump.dev

Influenced by
- AMPL, PuLP

JuMP is an algebraic modeling language and a collection of supporting packages for mathematical optimization embedded in the Julia programming language. JuMP is used by companies, government agencies, academic institutions, software projects, and individuals to formulate and submit optimization problems to third‑party solvers. JuMP has been specifically applied to problems in the field of operations research.

== Features ==
JuMP is a Julia package and domain-specific language that provides an API and syntax for declaring and solving optimization problems. Specialized syntax for declaring decision variables, adding constraints, and setting objective functions is facilitated by Julia's syntactic macros and metaprogramming features. JuMP supports linear programming, mixed integer programming, semidefinite programming, conic optimization, nonlinear programming, and other classes of optimization problems. JuMP provides access to over 50 solvers, including state-of-the-art commercial and open-source solvers.

== History ==
JuMP was first developed by Miles Lubin, Iain Dunning, and Joey Huchette while they were students at the Massachusetts Institute of Technology. Today, JuMP's core developers are Miles Lubin, Benoît Legat, Joaquim Dias Garcia, Joey Huchette, and Oscar Dowson. Miles Lubin additionally holds the title of BDFL. JuMP is a sponsored project of NumFOCUS.

== Recognition ==
JuMP and its authors have been acknowledged by the 2015 COIN-OR Cup, the 2016 INFORMS Computing Society Prize, and the Mathematical Optimization Society's 2021 Beale – Orchard‑Hays Prize.

== See also ==
- HiGHS optimization solver
- List of free and open-source optimization solvers
- Mathematical optimization
- PuLP – a similar project for Python
- Pyomo – Python packages for formulating optimization problems
