= Sector coupling =

Integration of energy sectors

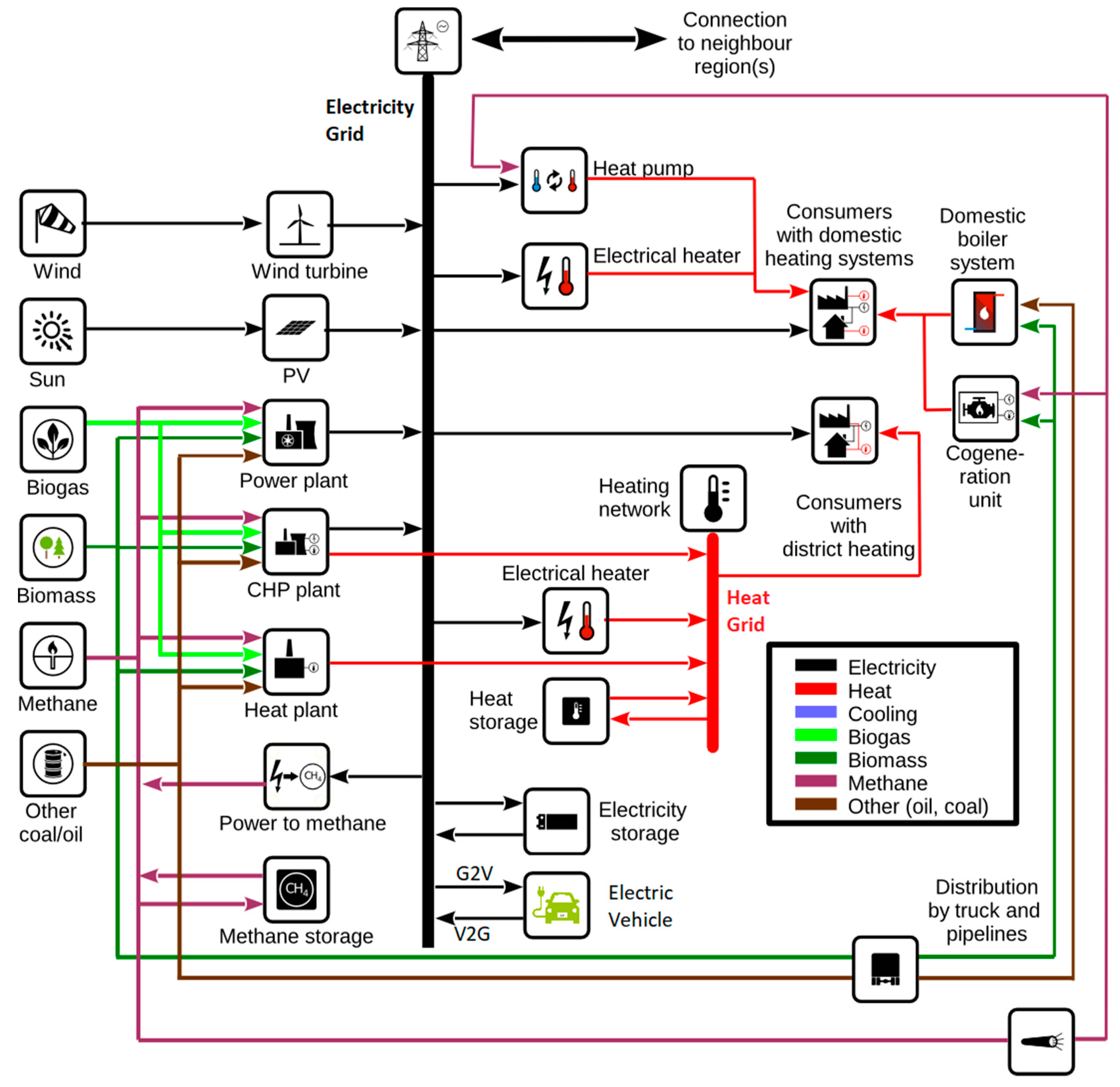
Integrated energy system through sector coupling

Sector coupling or sector integration is a concept in which electricity produced from renewable energy sources is used to substitute fossil fuels within all end-consumption sectors, including transport, industry, and residential heating/cooling. The key goal is the integration of large-scale renewable electricity, mainly from wind and solar power, by increasing its direct use or indirect application through transformation into a suitable energy carrier, for example heat, gas, and liquids. Sector coupling supports the creation of 100% renewable energy systems, adds flexibility and improves storage and distribution options to the use of renewable electricity.

Sector coupling and system integration are regarded as key concepts in the global energy transition, as it makes the adoption of renewable energy sources more efficient and cheaper. The sector coupling concept has also been further developed into fully integrated energy systems. These are also called smart energy systems (not to be confused with the Smart grid approach, as the latter only refers to the power sector). A smart energy system is defined as "as an approach in which smart electricity, thermal and gas grids are combined with storage technologies and coordinated to identify synergies between them in order to achieve an optimal solution for each individual sector as well as for the overall energy system."

== Concept ==
Using power-to-X-technologies, sector coupling offers possibilities to exploit synergies across different energy sectors, for example by using power-to-heat-technologies such as heat pumps and cheap thermal energy storage to (better) integrate surplus energy from renewable electricity and thus decarbonize the heating sector. It also includes the production of electrofuels, by which aviation or shipping can be decarbonized. However, in order to reach the highest efficiency and lowest cost, direct electricity use in technologies such as heat pumps and battery-electric vehicles should be prioritized wherever possible, while much less efficient hydrogen solutions or hydrogen-to-X conversions for e-fuels and e-chemicals should only be used where other solutions are impossible. Though, while electrification typically is the most cost-efficient decarbonization route in all economic sectors, there still remains a relatively small but though essential contribution of hydrogen use to allow deep decarbonization.

Sector coupling has also been used to overcome undesired limitations from single sector based energy analysis. Typically, if energy system analysis focus only on the electricity sector, these studies often result in high levels of curtailment of renewable power and high costs of balancing, as they cannot use the flexibility provided by other energy sectors. This can lead to unrealistic assumptions and results. However, if a fully integrated smart energy system is used, cheaper solutions in non-electricity-sectors can be used, as a cross-sectoral approach makes it possible to convert renewable electricity to energy carriers that can be stored in much more affordable types of energy storage.
