= GHGProof =

GHGProof is an open-source model designed to evaluate the impacts of land-use decisions on greenhouse gas emissions and energy consumption at the community scale. It has been developed by Sustainability Solutions Group, a Canadian workers co-operative, and has been widely used in British Columbia since 2008, with regular revisions and updates from SSG's GHGProof pages. Reviews of GHGProof and comparison to other modelling platforms may be found in references.

== History ==
GHGProof was first conceived in a project designed to evaluate the impact of a land-use plan on Salt Spring Island in BC, commissioned by the Islands Trust. Following this project, SSG was awarded a research grant from CMHC and worked with the Fraser Valley Regional District to develop an open source model for wide distribution. GHGProof was piloted with the City of Abbotsford and the Town of Hope, and baseline GHG inventories were created for a workshop with all the FVRD municipalities in which they could develop scenarios. The Government of BC requires that all municipalities include GHG targets in their official community plans, creating an incentive for this type of modelling. An article in Municipal World describes the use of the model in the FVRD.

== Architecture ==
GHGProof consists of two components. The first component is a series of analysis in GIS that analyse travel behaviour, building distribution and forest and agricultural areas for a community. The second component is an excel spreadsheet that takes inputs from the GIS analysis and uses a series of calculations to generate GHG emissions, energy use and energy costs for a community. For a detailed summary on the structure of the model see the GHGProof Guidebook. Interactive skins have been placed over the model to facilitate community engagement.

== Scope ==
GHGProof includes GHG emissions and reductions from public and private transportation, mode shifting to walking and cycling, commercial transportation, private dwellings, commercial buildings, embodied carbon from road construction, district energy, agricultural practices, liquid and solid waste, food miles (transportation of food), forest area and forest practices. New parameters are added periodically.

Outputs of the model include total GHG emissions, per capita GHG emissions, reductions by type, energy use by type, vehicle kilometres travelled, mode share$, savings from energy$, of investment, jobs created and marginal abatement cost.

== Uses ==
GHGProof has been used by communities to evaluate land-use planning decisions including to develop an achievable GHG target, develop a realistic strategy to achieve a target, evaluate a large-scale development proposal and evaluate a land-use plan.

== Licence ==
GHGProof is licensed under a Creative Commons Attribution-NonCommercial-ShareAlike 3.0 Unported License.

== Municipalities where GHGProof has been used ==
- Abbotsford
- View Royal
- Fraser Valley Regional District
- Capital Regional District
- North Cowichan
- Kent, British Columbia
- University of British Columbia
- Port Clements
- Village of Queen Charlotte
- Masset
- Chilliwack
- Salt Spring Island
- Lasqueti Island
- North Saanich
- Comox, BC
- Hope, British Columbia
- Sunshine Coast Regional District

== Official page ==
GHGProof from Sustainability Solutions Group
