= GridLAB-D =

GridLAB-D is an open-source (BSD license) simulation and analysis tool that models emerging smart grid energy technologies. It couples power flow calculations with distribution automation models, building energy use and appliance demand models, and market models. It is used primarily to estimate the benefits and impacts of smart grid technology.

== Research and development ==
Funding for the research and development of GridLAB-D has come from multiple sources, including the United States Department of Energy (US DOE) and the California Energy Commission (CEC).

=== United States Department of Energy ===
GridLAB-D was developed with funding from the US DOE Office of Electricity (OE) at Pacific Northwest National Laboratory (PNNL), in collaboration with industry and academia. It is available for Microsoft Windows, macOS and several Linux implementations and released through GitHub.

Original work on GridLAB-D was started at PNNL in 2003 under a Laboratory Directed Research and Development project called PDSS. Starting in 2008 GridLAB-D was made available to the public under a BSD-style open-source license with a US Government right-to-use clause. US DOE has supported GridLAB-D through both direct funding and funding of projects that support enhancements to the simulation's capabilities.

=== California Energy Commission ===
In 2017 the CEC awarded several grants to enhance GridLAB-D with the aim to support use in California regions operated by the investor-owned utility ratepayers. The enhancements focus on the California Public Utilities Commission's (CPUC) proceedings related to distributed and renewable energy resource integration, with particular attention to usability, scalability and interoperability. Hitachi America Laboratory (HAL) leads the GridLAB-D Open Workspace (GLOW) project to develop a user-interface for GridLAB-D. SLAC National Accelerator Laboratory (SLAC) leads the High-Performance Agent-based Simulation (HiPAS) project to enhance the performance of GridLAB-D. HiPAS GridLAB-D is released through GitHub. SLAC also leads the Open Framework for Integrated Data Operations (OpenFIDO) to support data exchange between GridLAB-D and other widely used power system data collection, modeling, and analytics tools.

=== Arras Energy ===
In 2022 LF Energy adopted HiPAS GridLAB-D as an open-source project under the name Arras Energy.

== See also ==
- Open energy system models – listing a number of open source electricity and energy system modeling projects
