= Cholesky =

Cholesky may refer to:

- André-Louis Cholesky, French military officer and mathematician,
  - Cholesky decomposition, developed by the mathematician,
  - Incomplete Cholesky factorization,
  - Symbolic Cholesky decomposition.
