= GLOP =

Google program

GLOP (the Google Linear Optimization Package) is Google's open-source linear programming solver, created by Google's Operations Research Team. It is written in C++ and was released to the public as part of Google's OR-Tools software suite in 2014.

GLOP uses a revised primal-dual simplex algorithm optimized for sparse matrices. It uses Markowitz pivoting to reduce matrix fill-in, steepest-edge pricing to avoid degenerate pivots, and an LU decomposition tailored for sparse matrices.

Inside Google, GLOP is used to stabilize YouTube videos and outside Google, it has been used to perform fast linear relaxations for reinforcement learning.
