= Crout =

Crout is a surname. Notable people with the surname include:

- Alfred Crout Harmer (1825–1900), American politician, a Republican member of the United States House of Representatives from Pennsylvania
- Henry Crout (fl. 1612–1617), English settler, explorer
- John Crout (1899–1987), American engineer
- Mabel Crout (1890–1984), British politician
- Prescott Durand Crout (1907–1984), American mathematician

== See also ==
- Crout matrix decomposition, a matrix decomposition
