= Montguyon =

- Commune
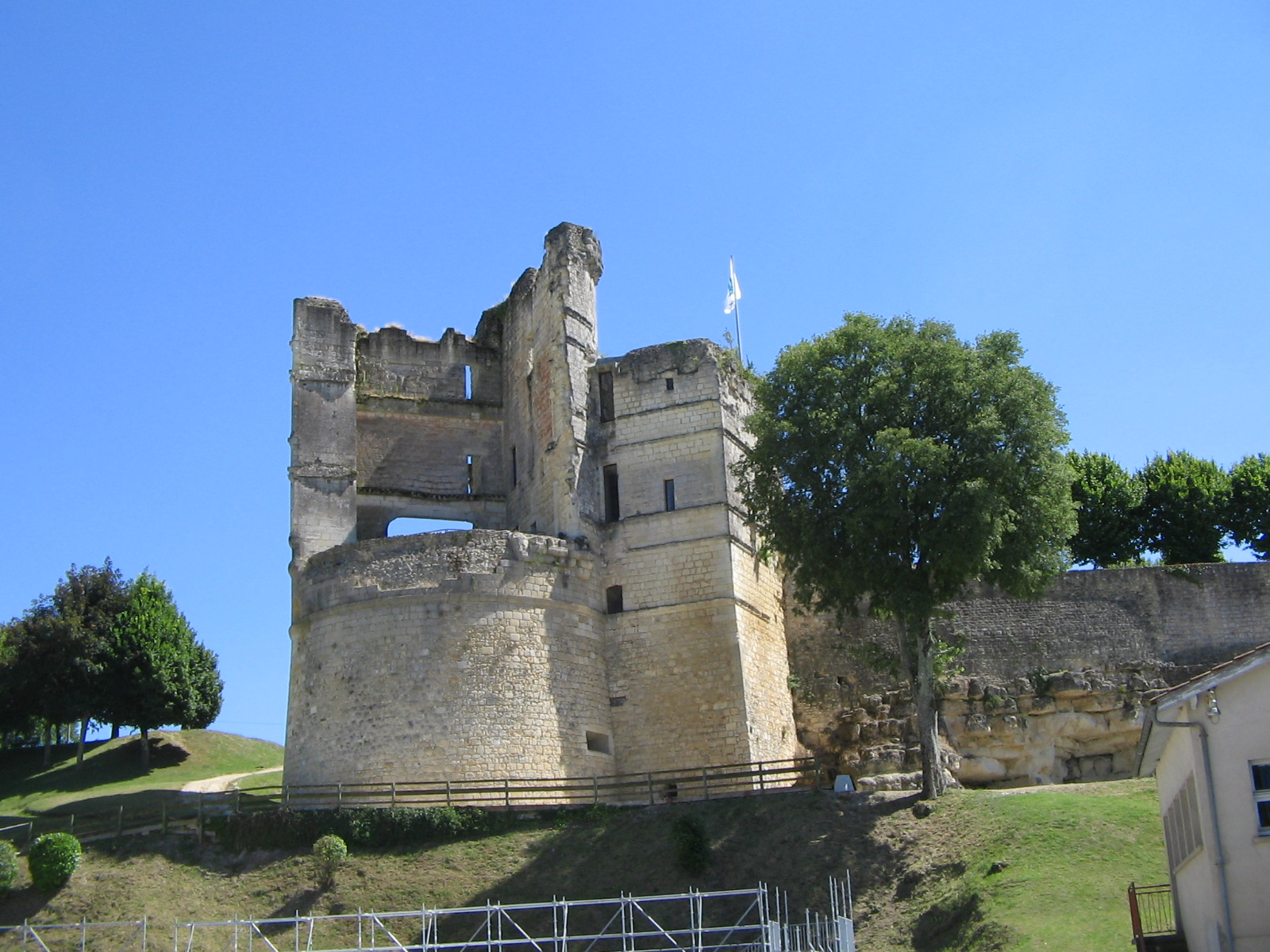
- Ruins of the chateau

- Coat of arms
- Location of Montguyon
- Location within France Location within Nouvelle-Aquitaine
- Coordinates: 45°12′58″N 0°11′14″W
- Country: France
- Region: Nouvelle-Aquitaine
- Department: Charente-Maritime
- Arrondissement: Jonzac
- Canton: Les Trois Monts
- Intercommunality: Haute-Saintonge

Government
  - Mayor (2020–2026): Julien Mouchebœuf
- Area^{1}: 18.18 km^{2} (7.02 sq mi)
- Elevation: 60 m (200 ft)
- Highest elevation: 121 m (397 ft)
- Lowest elevation: 30 m (98 ft)
- Population (2023): 1,705
  - Density: 93.78/km^{2} (242.9/sq mi)
- Time zone: UTC+01:00 (CET)
  - Summer (DST): UTC+02:00 (CEST)
- INSEE/Postal code: 17241 /17270
- ^{1} French Land Register data, which excludes lakes, ponds, glaciers > 1 km^{2} (0.386 sq mi or 247 acres) and river estuaries.

Montguyon (French pronunciation: [mɔ̃ɡɥijɔ̃]) is a commune in the Charente-Maritime department in southwestern France.

== Population ==
Historical population
Year	Pop.	±% p.a.
1968	1,841	—
1975	1,648	−1.57%
1982	1,662	+0.12%
1990	1,647	−0.11%
1999	1,462	−1.32%
2007	1,454	−0.07%
2012	1,491	+0.50%
2017	1,576	+1.12%
2023	1,705	+1.32%
Source: INSEE

== Notable people ==
The French mathematician, geodesist and military officer André-Louis Cholesky who devised Cholesky decomposition method was born here.

== See also ==
- Communes of the Charente-Maritime department
