= Doolittle method =

The Doolittle method may refer to:

- The Doolittle algorithm for LU decomposition in numerical analysis and linear algebra
- The most common method of rearing queen bees
