= André-Louis Cholesky =

French military officer and mathematician (1875–1918)

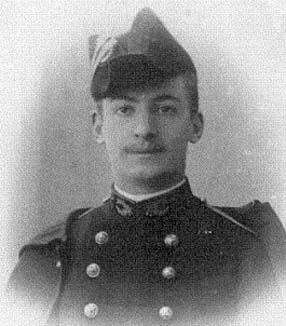
- Born: 15 October 1875; Montguyon, France
- Died: 31 August 1918 (aged 42); Bagneux, France
- Cause of death: Killed in action
- Education: Ecole Polytechnique
- Known for: Cholesky decomposition Symbolic Cholesky decomposition Incomplete Cholesky factorization
- Scientific career
- Fields: Mathematics

André-Louis Cholesky (15 October 1875, in Montguyon – 31 August 1918, in Bagneux) was a French military officer, geodesist, and mathematician.

== Life and scientific career ==
Cholesky was born in Montguyon, France. His paternal family was descended from the Cholewski family, which emigrated from Poland during the Great Emigration. He attended the lycée in Bordeaux and entered the École Polytechnique, where Camille Jordan and Henri Becquerel taught. He worked in geodesy and cartography, and he was involved in the surveying of Crete (1907-1908) and North Africa before WWI.

Cholesky is primarily remembered for the development of a form of matrix decomposition known as the Cholesky decomposition, which he used in his surveying work. Specifically, he applied his decomposition to solve the normal equations arising in least squares problems. By exploiting the special properties of the normal equations matrix (symmetry and positive-definiteness), this method requires fewer arithmetic operations than standard Gaussian elimination. This was a vital practical breakthrough for the era, as calculations were performed entirely by hand or with the aid of basic mechanical calculators.

Cholesky served in the French military as an artillery officer and was killed in battle a few months before the end of World War I; his discovery was published posthumously by his fellow officer Commandant Benoît in Bulletin Géodésique.
