= LU reduction =

Matrix reduction algorithm

LU reduction is an algorithm related to LU decomposition. This term is usually used in the context of super computing and highly parallel computing. In this context it is used as a benchmarking algorithm, i.e. to provide a comparative measurement of speed for different computers. LU reduction is a special parallelized version of an LU decomposition algorithm, an example can be found in (Guitart 2001). The parallelized version usually distributes the work for a matrix row to a single processor and synchronizes the result with the whole matrix (Escribano 2000).

== Sources ==
- J. Oliver, J. Guitart, E. Ayguadé, N. Navarro and J. Torres. Strategies for Efficient Exploitation of Loop-level Parallelism in Java. Concurrency and Computation: Practice and Experience(Java Grande 2000 Special Issue), Vol.13 (8-9), pp. 663–680. ISSN 1532-0634, July 2001, , last retrieved on Sept. 14 2007
- J. Guitart, X. Martorell, J. Torres, and E. Ayguadé, Improving Java Multithreading Facilities: the Java Nanos Environment, Research Report UPC-DAC-2001-8, Computer Architecture Department, Technical University of Catalonia, March 2001,.
- Arturo González-Escribano, Arjan J. C. van Gemund, Valentín Cardeñoso-Payo et al., Measuring the Performance Impact of SP-Restricted Programming in Shared-Memory Machines, In Vector and Parallel Processing — VECPAR 2000, Springer Verlag, pp. 128–141, ISBN 978-3-540-41999-0, 2000,
