= Francis B. Hildebrand =

American mathematician (1915–2002)

Francis Begnaud Hildebrand (1915 – 29 November 2002) was an American mathematician. He was a professor of mathematics at the Massachusetts Institute of Technology (MIT) from 1940 until 1984. Hildebrand was known for his many influential textbooks in mathematics and numerical analysis.

== Education and career ==
Hildebrand received his bachelor's degree in 1936 and a master's degree in 1938 from Washington & Jefferson College, both in mathematics. He then received his Ph.D. degree from Massachusetts Institute of Technology in 1940 under the supervision of Prescott Durand Crout. He also received an honorary doctorate from Washington and Jefferson College in 1969. During World War II, he worked for two years in the Radiation Laboratory.

At MIT, he taught 18.075 and 18.076, the classes on advanced calculus for engineering students. The big green textbook from these classes (originally Advanced Calculus for Engineers, later Advanced Calculus for Applications) was a fixture in engineers' offices for decades.

== Books ==
Hildebrand had authored many influential textbooks in mathematics, including

- Advanced Calculus for Engineers, Prentice Hall, 1948.
- Methods of Applied Mathematics, Prentice Hall, 1952.
- Advanced Calculus for Applications, Prentice Hall, 1964.
- Introduction to Numerical Analysis, 2 ed., Dover Publications, 1987 ISBN 0-486-65363-3 (First edition in 1956).
