= Block matrix =

Matrix defined using smaller matrices called blocks

In mathematics, a block matrix or a partitioned matrix is a matrix that is interpreted as having been broken into sections called blocks or submatrices.

Intuitively, a matrix interpreted as a block matrix can be visualized as the original matrix with a collection of horizontal and vertical lines, which break it up, or partition it, into a collection of smaller matrices. For example, the 3×4 matrix presented below is divided by horizontal and vertical lines into four blocks: the top-left 2×3 block, the top-right 2×1 block, the bottom-left 1×3 block, and the bottom-right 1×1 block.

$$\left[
\begin{array}{ccc|c}
a_{11} & a_{12} & a_{13} & b_{1} \\
a_{21} & a_{22} & a_{23} & b_{2} \\
\hline
c_{1} & c_{2} & c_{3} & d
\end{array}
\right]$$

Any matrix may be interpreted as a block matrix in one or more ways, with each interpretation defined by how its rows and columns are partitioned.

This notion can be made more precise for an $n$ by $m$ matrix $M$ by partitioning $n$ into a collection $\text{rowgroups}$, and then partitioning $m$ into a collection $\text{colgroups}$. The original matrix is then considered as the "total" of these groups, in the sense that the $(i, j)$ entry of the original matrix corresponds in a 1-to-1 way with some $(s, t)$ offset entry of some $(x,y)$, where $x \in \text{rowgroups}$ and $y \in \text{colgroups}$.

Block matrix algebra arises in general from biproducts in categories of matrices.

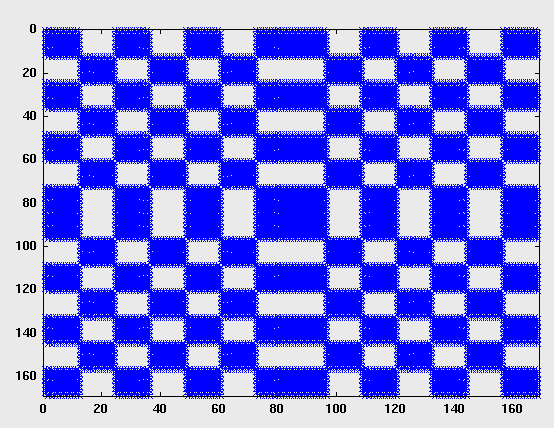
A 168×168 element block matrix with 12×12, 12×24, 24×12, and 24×24 sub-matrices. Non-zero elements are in blue, zero elements are grayed.

== Example ==
The matrix

$$\mathbf{P} = \begin{bmatrix}
1 & 2 & 2 & 7 \\
1 & 5 & 6 & 2 \\
3 & 3 & 4 & 5 \\
3 & 3 & 6 & 7
\end{bmatrix}$$

can be visualized as divided into four blocks, as

$$\mathbf{P} = \left[
\begin{array}{cc|cc}
1 & 2 & 2 & 7 \\
1 & 5 & 6 & 2 \\
\hline
3 & 3 & 4 & 5 \\
3 & 3 & 6 & 7
\end{array}
\right].$$

The horizontal and vertical lines have no special mathematical meaning, but are a common way to visualize a partition. By this partition, $P$ is partitioned into four 2×2 blocks, as

$$\begin{align}
\mathbf{P}_{11} &= \begin{bmatrix}
1 & 2 \\
1 & 5
\end{bmatrix}, &
\mathbf{P}_{12} &= \begin{bmatrix}
2 & 7\\
6 & 2
\end{bmatrix}, \\[1ex]
\mathbf{P}_{21} &= \begin{bmatrix}
3 & 3 \\
3 & 3
\end{bmatrix},&
\mathbf{P}_{22} &= \begin{bmatrix}
4 & 5 \\
6 & 7
\end{bmatrix}.
\end{align}$$

The partitioned matrix can then be written as

$$\mathbf{P} = \begin{bmatrix}
\mathbf{P}_{11} & \mathbf{P}_{12} \\
\mathbf{P}_{21} & \mathbf{P}_{22}
\end{bmatrix}.$$

== Formal definition ==
Let $A \in \mathbb{C}^{m \times n}$. A partitioning of $A$ is a representation of $A$ in the form

$$A = \begin{bmatrix}
A_{11} & A_{12} & \cdots & A_{1q} \\
A_{21} & A_{22} & \cdots & A_{2q} \\
\vdots & \vdots & \ddots & \vdots \\
A_{p1} & A_{p2} & \cdots & A_{pq}
\end{bmatrix},$$

where $A_{ij} \in \mathbb{C}^{m_i \times n_j}$ are contiguous submatrices, $\sum_{i=1}^{p} m_i = m$, and $\sum_{j=1}^{q} n_j = n$. The elements $A_{ij}$ of the partition are called blocks.

By this definition, the blocks in any one column must all have the same number of columns. Similarly, the blocks in any one row must have the same number of rows.

=== Partitioning methods ===
A matrix can be partitioned in many ways. For example, a matrix $A$ is said to be partitioned by columns if it is written as

$$A = (a_1 \ a_2 \ \cdots \ a_n),$$

where $a_j$ is the $j$th column of $A$. A matrix can also be partitioned by rows:

$$A = \begin{bmatrix}
a_1^T \\
a_2^T \\
\vdots \\
a_m^T
\end{bmatrix},$$

where $a_i^T$ is the $i$-th row of $A$.

=== Common partitions ===
Often, we encounter the 2×2 partition

$$A = \begin{bmatrix}
A_{11} & A_{12} \\
A_{21} & A_{22}
\end{bmatrix},$$

particularly in the form where $A_{11}$ is a scalar:

$$A = \begin{bmatrix}
a_{11} & a_{12}^T \\
a_{21} & A_{22}
\end{bmatrix}.$$

== Block matrix operations ==
=== Transpose ===
Let

$$A = \begin{bmatrix}
A_{11} & A_{12} & \cdots & A_{1q} \\
A_{21} & A_{22} & \cdots & A_{2q} \\
\vdots & \vdots & \ddots & \vdots \\
A_{p1} & A_{p2} & \cdots & A_{pq}
\end{bmatrix}$$

where $A_{ij} \in \mathbb{C}^{k_i \times \ell_j}$. (This matrix $A$ will be reused in § Addition and § Multiplication.) Then its transpose is

$$A^T = \begin{bmatrix}
A_{11}^T & A_{21}^T & \cdots & A_{p1}^T \\
A_{12}^T & A_{22}^T & \cdots & A_{p2}^T \\
\vdots & \vdots & \ddots & \vdots \\
A_{1q}^T & A_{2q}^T & \cdots & A_{pq}^T
\end{bmatrix},$$

and the same equation holds with the transpose replaced by the conjugate transpose.

==== Block transpose ====
A special form of matrix transpose can also be defined for block matrices, where individual blocks are reordered but not transposed. Let $A = (B_{ij})$ be a $k \times l$ block matrix with $m \times n$ blocks $B_{ij}$, the block transpose of $A$ is the $l \times k$ block matrix $A^\mathcal{B}$ with $m \times n$ blocks $\left(A^\mathcal{B}\right)_{ij} = B_{ji}$. As with the conventional trace operator, the block transpose is a linear mapping such that $(A + C)^\mathcal{B} = A^\mathcal{B} + C^\mathcal{B}$. However, in general the property $(A C)^\mathcal{B} = C^\mathcal{B} A^\mathcal{B}$ does not hold unless the blocks of $A$ and $C$ commute.

=== Addition ===
Let

$$B = \begin{bmatrix}
B_{11} & B_{12} & \cdots & B_{1s} \\
B_{21} & B_{22} & \cdots & B_{2s} \\
\vdots & \vdots & \ddots & \vdots \\
B_{r1} & B_{r2} & \cdots & B_{rs}
\end{bmatrix},$$

where $B_{ij} \in \mathbb{C}^{m_i \times n_j}$, and let $A$ be the matrix defined in § Transpose. (This matrix $B$ will be reused in § Multiplication.) Then if $p = r$, $q = s$, $k_i = m_i$, and $\ell_j = n_j$, then

$$A + B = \begin{bmatrix}
A_{11} + B_{11} & A_{12} + B_{12} & \cdots & A_{1q} + B_{1q} \\
A_{21} + B_{21} & A_{22} + B_{22} & \cdots & A_{2q} + B_{2q} \\
\vdots & \vdots & \ddots & \vdots \\
A_{p1} + B_{p1} & A_{p2} + B_{p2} & \cdots & A_{pq} + B_{pq}
\end{bmatrix}.$$

=== Multiplication ===
It is possible to use a block partitioned matrix product that involves only algebra on submatrices of the factors. The partitioning of the factors is not arbitrary, however, and requires "conformable partitions" between two matrices $A$ and $B$ such that all submatrix products that will be used are defined.

Two matrices $A$ and $B$ are said to be partitioned conformally for the product $AB$, when $A$ and $B$ are partitioned into submatrices and if the multiplication $AB$ is carried out treating the submatrices as if they are scalars, but keeping the order, and when all products and sums of submatrices involved are defined.

— Arak M. Mathai and Hans J. Haubold, Linear Algebra: A Course for Physicists and Engineers

Let $A$ be the matrix defined in § Transpose, and let $B$ be the matrix defined in § Addition. Then the matrix product

$$C = AB$$

can be performed blockwise, yielding $C$ as an $(p \times s)$ matrix. The matrices in the resulting matrix $C$ are calculated by multiplying:

$$C_{ij} = \sum_{k=1}^{q} A_{ik}B_{kj}.$$

Or, using the Einstein notation that implicitly sums over repeated indices:

$$C_{ij} = A_{ik}B_{kj}.$$

Depicting $C$ as a matrix, we have

$$C = AB = \begin{bmatrix}
\sum_{i=1}^{q} A_{1i}B_{i1} & \sum_{i=1}^{q} A_{1i}B_{i2} & \cdots & \sum_{i=1}^{q} A_{1i}B_{is} \\
\sum_{i=1}^{q} A_{2i}B_{i1} & \sum_{i=1}^{q} A_{2i}B_{i2} & \cdots & \sum_{i=1}^{q} A_{2i}B_{is} \\
\vdots & \vdots & \ddots & \vdots \\
\sum_{i=1}^{q} A_{pi}B_{i1} & \sum_{i=1}^{q} A_{pi}B_{i2} & \cdots & \sum_{i=1}^{q} A_{pi}B_{is}
\end{bmatrix}.$$

=== Inversion ===
If a matrix is partitioned into four blocks, it can be inverted blockwise as follows:

$$\begin{align}
P &= \begin{bmatrix}
A & B \\
C & D
\end{bmatrix}^{-1} \\[1ex]
&= \begin{bmatrix}
A^{-1} + A^{-1} B \left(D - CA^{-1} B\right)^{-1} CA^{-1} &
-A^{-1} B\left(D - C A^{-1}B\right)^{-1} \\
-\left(D - CA^{-1}B\right)^{-1} C A^{-1} &
\left(D - C A^{-1} B\right)^{-1}
\end{bmatrix},
\end{align}$$

where A and D are square blocks of arbitrary size, and B and C are conformable with them for partitioning. Furthermore, A and the Schur complement of A in P: P/A = D − CA^{−1}B must be invertible.

Equivalently, by permuting the blocks:

$$\begin{align}
P &= \begin{bmatrix}
A & B \\
C & D
\end{bmatrix}^{-1} \\[1ex]
&= \begin{bmatrix}
\left(A - BD^{-1}C\right)^{-1} &
-\left(A-BD^{-1}C\right)^{-1} BD^{-1} \\
-D^{-1}C\left(A - BD^{-1}C\right)^{-1} &
D^{-1} + D^{-1}C\left(A - BD^{-1}C\right)^{-1}BD^{-1}
\end{bmatrix}.
\end{align}$$

Here, D and the Schur complement of D in P: P/D = A − BD^{−1}C must be invertible.

If A and D are both invertible, then:

$$\begin{bmatrix}
A & B \\
C & D
\end{bmatrix}^{-1} = \begin{bmatrix}
\left(A - B D^{-1} C\right)^{-1} & 0 \\
0 & \left(D - C A^{-1} B\right)^{-1}
\end{bmatrix} \begin{bmatrix}
I & -B D^{-1} \\
-C A^{-1} &  I
\end{bmatrix}.$$

By the Weinstein–Aronszajn identity, one of the two matrices in the block-diagonal matrix is invertible exactly when the other is. Block matrix inversion also enables to yield from the efficiency of the fast matrix multiplication algorithms, which allows to perform the inversion in time $O({n^\omega })$ for $~2.37 \le \omega < 3$^{, Sect. 11, pp. 413-414}.

==== Computing submatrix inverses from the full inverse ====
By the symmetry between a matrix and its inverse in the block inversion formula, if a matrix P and its inverse P^{−1} are partitioned conformally:

$$P = \begin{bmatrix}
{A} & {B} \\
{C} & {D}
\end{bmatrix}, \quad P^{-1} = \begin{bmatrix}
{E} & {F} \\
{G} & {H}
\end{bmatrix}$$

then the inverse of any principal submatrix can be computed from the corresponding blocks of P^{−1}:

$${A}^{-1} = {E} - {FH}^{-1}{G}$$
$${D}^{-1} = {H} - {GE}^{-1}{F}$$

This relationship follows from recognizing that E^{−1} = A − BD^{−1}C (the Schur complement), and applying the same block inversion formula with the roles of P and P^{−1} reversed.

=== Determinant ===
The formula for the determinant of a $2 \times 2$-matrix above continues to hold, under appropriate further assumptions, for a matrix composed of four submatrices $A, B, C, D$ with $A$ and $D$ square. The easiest such formula, which can be proven using either the Leibniz formula or a factorization involving the Schur complement, is
$$\det\begin{bmatrix}A& 0\\ C& D\end{bmatrix} = \det(A) \det(D) = \det\begin{bmatrix}A& B\\ 0& D\end{bmatrix}.$$

Using this formula, we can derive that characteristic polynomials of
$$\begin{bmatrix}A& 0\\ C& D\end{bmatrix}$$
and
$$\begin{bmatrix}A& B\\ 0& D\end{bmatrix}$$
are same and equal to the product of characteristic polynomials of $A$ and $D$. Furthermore, If
$$\begin{bmatrix}A& 0\\ C& D\end{bmatrix}$$
or
$$\begin{bmatrix}A& B\\ 0& D\end{bmatrix}$$
is diagonalizable, then $A$ and $D$ are diagonalizable too. The converse is false; simply check
$$\begin{bmatrix}1& 1\\ 0& 1\end{bmatrix}$$.

If $A$ is invertible, one has

$$\det\begin{bmatrix}A& B\\ C& D\end{bmatrix} = \det(A) \det\left(D - C A^{-1} B\right),$$

and if $D$ is invertible, one has

$$\det\begin{bmatrix}A& B\\ C& D\end{bmatrix} = \det(D) \det\left(A - B D^{-1} C\right) .$$

If the blocks are square matrices of the same size further formulas hold. For example, if $C$ and $D$ commute (i.e., $CD=DC$), then
$$\det\begin{bmatrix}A& B\\ C& D\end{bmatrix} = \det(AD - BC).$$
Similar statements hold when $AB=BA$, $AC=CA$, or $BD=DB$. Namely, if $AC = CA$, then
$$\det\begin{bmatrix}A& B\\ C& D\end{bmatrix} = \det(AD - CB).$$
Note the change in order of $C$ and $B$ (we have $CB$ instead of $BC$). Similarly, if $BD = DB$, then $AD$ should be replaced with $DA$ (i.e. we get $\det(DA - BC)$) and if $AB = BA$, then we should have $\det(DA - CB)$. Note for the last two results, you have to use commutativity of the underlying ring, but not for the first two.

This formula has been generalized to matrices composed of more than $2 \times 2$ blocks, again under appropriate commutativity conditions among the individual blocks.

For $A = D$ and $B=C$, the following formula holds (even if $A$ and $B$ do not commute)
$$\det\begin{bmatrix}A& B\\ B& A\end{bmatrix} = \det(A - B) \det(A + B).$$

== Special types of block matrices ==
=== Direct sums and block diagonal matrices ===
==== Direct sum ====
For any arbitrary matrices A (of size m × n) and B (of size p × q), we have the direct sum of A and B, denoted by A ⊕ B and defined as

$${A} \oplus {B} =
\begin{bmatrix}
a_{11} & \cdots & a_{1n} &      0 & \cdots &      0 \\
\vdots & \ddots & \vdots & \vdots & \ddots & \vdots \\
a_{m1} & \cdots & a_{mn} &      0 & \cdots &      0 \\
0 & \cdots &      0 & b_{11} & \cdots & b_{1q} \\
\vdots & \ddots & \vdots & \vdots & \ddots & \vdots \\
0 & \cdots &      0 & b_{p1} & \cdots & b_{pq}
\end{bmatrix}.$$

For instance,

$$\begin{bmatrix}
1 & 3 & 2 \\
2 & 3 & 1
\end{bmatrix} \oplus
\begin{bmatrix}
1 & 6 \\
0 & 1
\end{bmatrix} =
\begin{bmatrix}
1 & 3 & 2 & 0 & 0 \\
2 & 3 & 1 & 0 & 0 \\
0 & 0 & 0 & 1 & 6 \\
0 & 0 & 0 & 0 & 1
\end{bmatrix}.$$

This operation generalizes naturally to arbitrary dimensioned arrays (provided that A and B have the same number of dimensions).

Note that any element in the direct sum of two vector spaces of matrices could be represented as a direct sum of two matrices.

==== Block diagonal matrices ====
A block diagonal matrix is a block matrix that is a square matrix such that the main-diagonal blocks are square matrices and all off-diagonal blocks are zero matrices. That is, a block diagonal matrix A has the form

$${A} = \begin{bmatrix}
A_1 & 0    & \cdots & 0   \\
0   & A_2  & \cdots & 0   \\
\vdots     & \vdots & \ddots & \vdots \\
0   & 0    & \cdots & A_n
\end{bmatrix}$$

where A_{k} is a square matrix for all k = 1, ..., n. In other words, matrix A is the direct sum of A_{1}, ..., A_{n}. It can also be indicated as A_{1} ⊕ A_{2} ⊕ ... ⊕ A_{n} or diag(A_{1}, A_{2}, ..., A_{n}) (the latter being the same formalism used for a diagonal matrix). Any square matrix can trivially be considered a block diagonal matrix with only one block.

For the determinant and trace, the following properties hold:
$$\det{A} = \det{A}_1 \times \cdots \times \det{A}_n,$$
$$\operatorname{tr}{A} = \operatorname{tr} {A}_1 + \cdots + \operatorname{tr} {A}_n.$$

A block diagonal matrix is invertible if and only if each of its main-diagonal blocks are invertible, and in this case its inverse is another block diagonal matrix given by
$$\begin{bmatrix}
{A}_{1} & {0}     & \cdots & {0} \\
{0}     & {A}_{2} & \cdots & {0} \\
\vdots         & \vdots         & \ddots & \vdots \\
{0}     & {0}     & \cdots & {A}_{n}
\end{bmatrix}^{-1} = \begin{bmatrix}
{A}_{1}^{-1} & {0}          & \cdots & {0} \\
{0}          & {A}_{2}^{-1} & \cdots & {0} \\
\vdots              & \vdots              & \ddots & \vdots \\
{0}          & {0}          & \cdots & {A}_{n}^{-1}
\end{bmatrix}.$$

The eigenvalues and eigenvectors of ${A}$ are simply those of the ${A}_k$s combined.

=== Block tridiagonal matrices ===
A block tridiagonal matrix is another special block matrix, which is just like the block diagonal matrix a square matrix, having square matrices (blocks) in the lower diagonal, main diagonal and upper diagonal, with all other blocks being zero matrices. It is essentially a tridiagonal matrix but has submatrices in places of scalars. A block tridiagonal matrix $A$ has the form

$${A} = \begin{bmatrix}
B_1    & C_1    &        &        & \cdots  &         & 0       \\
A_2    & B_2    & C_2    &        &         &         &         \\
& \ddots & \ddots & \ddots &         &         & \vdots  \\
&        & A_k    & B_k    & C_k     &         &         \\
\vdots &        &        & \ddots & \ddots  & \ddots  &         \\
&        &        &        & A_{n-1} & B_{n-1} & C_{n-1} \\
0      &        & \cdots &        &         & A_n     & B_n
\end{bmatrix}$$

where ${A}_{k}$, ${B}_{k}$ and ${C}_{k}$ are square sub-matrices of the lower, main and upper diagonal respectively.

Block tridiagonal matrices are often encountered in numerical solutions of engineering problems (e.g., computational fluid dynamics). Optimized numerical methods for LU factorization are available and hence efficient solution algorithms for equation systems with a block tridiagonal matrix as coefficient matrix. The Thomas algorithm, used for efficient solution of equation systems involving a tridiagonal matrix can also be applied using matrix operations to block tridiagonal matrices (see also Block LU decomposition).

=== Block triangular matrices ===
An $n \times n$ matrix $A$ is upper block triangular (or block upper triangular) if there are positive integers $n_1, \ldots, n_k$ such that $n = n_1 + n_2 + \ldots + n_k$ and
$$A = \begin{bmatrix}
A_{11} & A_{12} & \cdots & A_{1k} \\
0 & A_{22} & \cdots & A_{2k} \\
\vdots & \vdots & \ddots & \vdots \\
0 & 0 & \cdots & A_{kk}
\end{bmatrix},$$
where the matrix $A_{ij}$ is $n_i \times n_j$ for all $i, j = 1, \ldots, k$. Similarly, $A$ is lower block triangular if
$$A = \begin{bmatrix}
A_{11} & 0 & \cdots & 0 \\
A_{21} & A_{22} & \cdots & 0 \\
\vdots & \vdots & \ddots & \vdots \\
A_{k1} & A_{k2} & \cdots & A_{kk}
\end{bmatrix},$$
where $A_{ij}$ is $n_i \times n_j$ for all $i, j = 1, \ldots, k$.

=== Block Toeplitz matrices ===
A block Toeplitz matrix is another special block matrix, which contains blocks that are repeated down the diagonals of the matrix, as a Toeplitz matrix has elements repeated down the diagonal.

A matrix $A$ is block Toeplitz if $A_{(i,j)} = A_{(k,l)}$ for all $k - i = l - j$, that is,

$$A = \begin{bmatrix}
A_1 & A_2 & A_3 & \cdots \\
A_4 & A_1 & A_2 & \cdots \\
A_5 & A_4 & A_1 & \cdots \\
\vdots & \vdots & \vdots & \ddots
\end{bmatrix},$$

where $A_i \in \mathbb{F}^{n_i \times m_i}$.

=== Block Hankel matrices ===
A matrix $A$ is block Hankel if $A_{(i,j)} = A_{(k,l)}$ for all $i + j = k + l$, that is,

$$A = \begin{bmatrix}
A_1 & A_2 & A_3 & \cdots \\
A_2 & A_3 & A_4 & \cdots \\
A_3 & A_4 & A_5 & \cdots \\
\vdots & \vdots & \vdots & \ddots
\end{bmatrix},$$

where $A_i \in \mathbb{F}^{n_i \times m_i}$.

== See also ==
- Kronecker product (matrix direct product resulting in a block matrix)
- Jordan normal form (canonical form of a linear operator on a finite-dimensional complex vector space)
- Strassen algorithm (algorithm for matrix multiplication that is faster than the conventional matrix multiplication algorithm)
