= Block LU decomposition =

Type of matrix factorization

In linear algebra, a Block LU decomposition is a matrix decomposition of a block matrix into a lower block triangular matrix L and an upper block triangular matrix U. This decomposition is used in numerical analysis to reduce the complexity of the block matrix formula.

== Block LDU decomposition ==
$$\begin{pmatrix}
A & B \\
C & D
\end{pmatrix}
=
\begin{pmatrix}
I & 0 \\
C A^{-1} & I
\end{pmatrix}
\begin{pmatrix}
A & 0 \\
0 & D-C A^{-1} B
\end{pmatrix}
\begin{pmatrix}
I & A^{-1} B \\
0 & I
\end{pmatrix}$$

== Block Cholesky decomposition ==
Consider a block matrix:
$$\begin{pmatrix}
A & B \\
C & D
\end{pmatrix}
=
\begin{pmatrix}
I \\
C A^{-1}
\end{pmatrix}
\,A\,
\begin{pmatrix}
I & A^{-1}B
\end{pmatrix}
+
\begin{pmatrix}
0 & 0 \\
0 & D-C A^{-1} B
\end{pmatrix},$$
where the matrix
$$\begin{matrix}A\end{matrix}$$
is assumed to be non-singular,
$$\begin{matrix}I\end{matrix}$$
is an identity matrix with proper dimension, and
$$\begin{matrix}0\end{matrix}$$
is a matrix whose elements are all zero.

We can also rewrite the above equation using the half matrices:
$$\begin{pmatrix}
A & B \\
C & D
\end{pmatrix}
=
\begin{pmatrix}
A^{\frac{1}{2}} \\
C A^{-\frac{*}{2}}
\end{pmatrix}
\begin{pmatrix}
A^{\frac{*}{2}} & A^{-\frac{1}{2}}B
\end{pmatrix}
+
\begin{pmatrix}
0 & 0 \\
0 & Q^{\frac{1}{2}}
\end{pmatrix}
\begin{pmatrix}
0 & 0 \\
0 & Q^{\frac{*}{2}}
\end{pmatrix}
,$$
where the Schur complement of
$$\begin{matrix}A\end{matrix}$$
in the block matrix is defined by
$$\begin{matrix}
Q = D - C A^{-1} B
\end{matrix}$$
and the half matrices can be calculated by means of Cholesky decomposition or LDL decomposition. The half matrices satisfy that
$$\begin{matrix}
A^{\frac{1}{2}}\,A^{\frac{*}{2}}=A;
\end{matrix}
\qquad
\begin{matrix}
A^{\frac{1}{2}}\,A^{-\frac{1}{2}}=I;
\end{matrix}
\qquad
\begin{matrix}
A^{-\frac{*}{2}}\,A^{\frac{*}{2}}=I;
\end{matrix}
\qquad
\begin{matrix}
Q^{\frac{1}{2}}\,Q^{\frac{*}{2}}=Q.
\end{matrix}$$

Thus, we have
$$\begin{pmatrix}
A & B \\
C & D
\end{pmatrix}
=
LU,$$
where
$$LU =
\begin{pmatrix}
A^{\frac{1}{2}}    & 0 \\
C A^{-\frac{*}{2}} & 0
\end{pmatrix}
\begin{pmatrix}
A^{\frac{*}{2}} & A^{-\frac{1}{2}}B \\
0               & 0
\end{pmatrix}
+
\begin{pmatrix}
0 & 0 \\
0 & Q^{\frac{1}{2}}
\end{pmatrix}
\begin{pmatrix}
0 & 0 \\
0 & Q^{\frac{*}{2}}
\end{pmatrix}.$$

The matrix
$$\begin{matrix}LU\end{matrix}$$
can be decomposed in an algebraic manner into
$$L =
\begin{pmatrix}
A^{\frac{1}{2}}    & 0 \\
C A^{-\frac{*}{2}} & Q^{\frac{1}{2}}
\end{pmatrix}
\mathrm{~~and~~}
U =
\begin{pmatrix}
A^{\frac{*}{2}} & A^{-\frac{1}{2}}B \\
0               & Q^{\frac{*}{2}}
\end{pmatrix}.$$

== See also ==
- Matrix decomposition
