= OR-Tools =

Open source software suite by Google

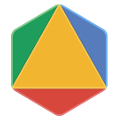
- Original author: Laurent Perron
- Developer: Google Optimization team
- Release: September 15, 2010; 16 years ago
- Stable release: v9.15 / January 12, 2026; 9 months ago
- Written in: C++
- Operating system: Linux, macOS, Microsoft Windows
- Type: Library
- License: Apache License 2.0
- Website: developers.google.com/optimization/
- Repository: github.com/google/or-tools

Google OR-Tools is a free and open-source software suite developed by Google for solving linear programming (LP), mixed integer programming (MIP), constraint programming (CP), vehicle routing (VRP), and related optimization problems. OR stands for operations research.

OR-Tools is a set of components written in C++ but provides wrappers for Java, .NET and Python.

It is distributed under the Apache License 2.0.

== History ==
OR-Tools was created by Laurent Perron in 2011.

In 2014, Google's open source linear programming solver, GLOP, was released as part of OR-Tools.

The CP-SAT solver bundled with OR-Tools has been consistently winning gold medals in the MiniZinc Challenge, an international constraint programming competition.

== Features ==
The OR-Tools supports a variety of programming languages, including:

- Object-oriented interfaces for C++
- A Java wrapper package
- A .NET and .NET Framework wrapper package
- A Python wrapper package

OR-Tools supports a wide range of problem types, among them:

- Assignment problem
- Linear programming
- Mixed-integer programming
- Constraint programming
- Vehicle routing problem
- Network flow algorithms

It supports the FlatZinc modeling language.

== See also ==
- COIN-OR
- CPLEX
- GLPK
- SCIP (optimization software)
- FICO Xpress
- MOSEK

== Bibliography ==
- Kruk, Serge (February 26, 2018). Practical Python AI Projects: Mathematical Models of Optimization Problems with Google OR-Tools (1st ed.). O'Reilly Media. ISBN 9781484234235.
- Da Col, Giacomo; Teppan, Eric C. (2019). "Google vs IBM: A Constraint Solving Challenge on the Job-Shop Scheduling Problem". Electronic Proceedings in Theoretical Computer Science. 306. Open Publishing Association: 259–265. arXiv:1909.08247. doi:10.4204/eptcs.306.30. ISSN 2075-2180. S2CID 202660711.
- Li, Mengyun; Chow, Joseph (April 2021). "School Bus Routing Problem with a Mixed Ride, Mixed Load, and Heterogeneous Fleet". Transportation Research Record: Journal of the Transportation Research Board. 2675 (7): 467–479. doi:10.1177/03611981211016860. S2CID 237618523.
