= Prescott Durand Crout =

American mathematician (1907–1984)

Prescott Durand Crout (July 28, 1907 – September 25, 1984) was an American mathematician.

Crout was born in Ohio, but lived and worked in Massachusetts. In 1929 he finished the MIT class. His PhD thesis (supervisor: George Rutledge) was entitled "The Approximation of Functions and Integrals by a Linear Combination of Functions".On January 2, 1933 he married Charlotte Louise Zander. They had four children.

He was member of the MIT Faculty of Mathematics from 1934 to 1973 and emeritus from 1973 to his death in 1984. He belonged to the Radiation Laboratory staff from 1941 to 1945. His students at the MIT were Francis Hildebrand (1940), Carl Nordling (1941), Frank Bothwell (1946), Norman Painter (1947), Merle Andrew (1948), Frederick Holt (1950), and Carl Steeg, Jr. (1952). He died, aged 77, in Lexington, Middlesex, Massachusetts. Prescott Durand Crout is author of the book "The Determination of Fields Satisfying Laplace's, Poisson's, and Associated Equations by Flux Plotting". He is the inventor of the Crout matrix decomposition.
