= Quadratically constrained quadratic program =

Optimization problem in mathematics

In mathematical optimization, a quadratically constrained quadratic program (QCQP) is an optimization problem in which both the objective function and the constraints are quadratic functions. It has the form

$$\begin{align}
& \text{minimize} && \tfrac12 x^\mathrm{T} P_0 x + q_0^\mathrm{T} x \\
& \text{subject to} && \tfrac12 x^\mathrm{T} P_i x + q_i^\mathrm{T} x + r_i \leq 0 \quad \text{for } i = 1,\dots,m , \\
&&& Ax = b,
\end{align}$$

where P_{0}, ..., P_{m} are n-by-n matrices and x ∈ R^{n} is the optimization variable.

If P_{0}, ..., P_{m} are all positive semidefinite, then the problem is convex. If these matrices are neither positive nor negative semidefinite, the problem is non-convex. If P_{1}, ... ,P_{m} are all zero, then the constraints are in fact linear and the problem is a quadratic program.

== Hardness ==
A convex QCQP problem can be efficiently solved using an interior point method (in a polynomial time), typically requiring around 30-60 iterations to converge. Solving the general non-convex case is an NP-hard problem.

To see this, note that the two constraints x_{1}(x_{1} − 1) ≤ 0 and x_{1}(x_{1} − 1) ≥ 0 are equivalent to the constraint x_{1}(x_{1} − 1) = 0, which is in turn equivalent to the constraint x_{1} ∈ {0, 1}. Hence, any 0–1 integer program (in which all variables have to be either 0 or 1) can be formulated as a quadratically constrained quadratic program. Since 0–1 integer programming is NP-hard in general, QCQP is also NP-hard.

However, even for a nonconvex QCQP problem a local solution can generally be found with a nonconvex variant of the interior point method. In some cases (such as when solving nonlinear programming problems with a sequential QCQP approach) these local solutions are sufficiently good to be accepted.

== Relaxation ==
There are two main relaxations of QCQP: using semidefinite programming (SDP), and using the reformulation-linearization technique (RLT). For some classes of QCQP problems (precisely, QCQPs with zero diagonal elements in the data matrices), second-order cone programming (SOCP) and linear programming (LP) relaxations providing the same objective value as the SDP relaxation are available.

Nonconvex QCQPs with non-positive off-diagonal elements can be exactly solved by the SDP or SOCP relaxations, and there are polynomial-time-checkable sufficient conditions for SDP relaxations of general QCQPs to be exact. Moreover, it was shown that a class of random general QCQPs has exact semidefinite relaxations with high probability as long as the number of constraints grows no faster than a fixed polynomial in the number of variables.

=== Semidefinite programming ===
When P_{0}, ..., P_{m} are all positive-definite matrices, the problem is convex and can be readily solved using interior point methods, as done with semidefinite programming.

== Example ==
- Max Cut is a problem in graph theory, which is NP-hard. Given a graph, the problem is to divide the vertices in two sets, so that as many edges as possible go from one set to the other. Max Cut can be formulated as a QCQP, and SDP relaxation of the dual provides good lower bounds.
- QCQP is used to finely tune machine setting in high-precision applications such as photolithography.

== Solvers and scripting (programming) languages ==
Name	Brief info
ALGLIB	ALGLIB, an open source/commercial numerical library, includes a QP solver supporting quadratic equality/inequality/range constraints, as well as other (conic) constraint types.
Artelys Knitro	Knitro is a solver specialized in nonlinear optimization, but also solves linear programming problems, quadratic programming problems, second-order cone programming, systems of nonlinear equations, and problems with equilibrium constraints.
FICO Xpress	A commercial optimization solver for linear programming, non-linear programming, mixed integer linear programming, convex quadratic programming, convex quadratically constrained quadratic programming, second-order cone programming and their mixed integer counterparts.
AMPL	
CPLEX	Popular solver with an API for several programming languages. Free for academics.
MOSEK	A solver for large scale optimization with API for several languages (C++, java, .net, Matlab and python)
TOMLAB	Supports global optimization, integer programming, all types of least squares, linear, quadratic and unconstrained programming for MATLAB. TOMLAB supports solvers like CPLEX, SNOPT and KNITRO.
Wolfram Mathematica	Able to solve QCQP type of problems using functions like Minimize.
clarabel	Open source interior point numerical solver for convex optimization problems, supports second-order cone programming.
