= MINTO =

Mathematical optimization software

MINTO (Mixed Integer Optimizer) is an integer programming solver which uses branch and bound algorithm.

MINTO is a software system that solves mixed integer programming problem by a branch and bound algorithm with linear programming relaxations. It also provides automatic constraint classification, preprocessing, primal heuristics and constraint generation. It also has inbuilt cut generation and can create knapsack cuts, GUB cuts, clique cuts, implication cuts, flow cuts, mixed integer rounding and Gomory cuts. Moreover, the user can enrich the basic algorithm by providing a variety of specialized application routines that can customize MINTO to achieve higher efficiency for a problem class.

MINTO does not have a linear programming (LP) solver of its own. It can use most of the LP solvers, like CLP, CPLEX, XPRESS through the OSI interface of COIN-OR. MINTO can read files in MPS and can also be called as a solver from AMPL. It can run on both Linux and Windows operating system. MINTO is a non-commercial solver and the executables are available for free download from its home page at COR@L.

== See also ==
- COIN-OR (Computational Infrastructure for Operations Research)
