= FortMP =

Optimization software package

- Developer: OptiRisk Systems
- Stable release: 3.2
- Platform: Cross-platform
- Type: Operations Research Tool, Numerical Software
- License: Proprietary
- Website: FortMP home page

FortMP is a software package for solving large-scale optimization problems. It solves linear programming problems, quadratic programming problems and mixed integer programming problems (both linear and quadratic). Its robustness has been explored and published in the Mathematical Programming journal. FortMP is available as a standalone executable that accepts input in MPS format and as a library with interfaces in C and Fortran. It is also supported in the AMPL modeling system.

The main algorithms implemented in FortMP are the primal and dual simplex algorithms using sparse matrices. These are supplemented for large problems and quadratic programming problems by interior point methods. Mixed integer programming problems are solved using branch and bound algorithm.
