= Sol (format) =

File format for representing solutions of mathematical programming problems

- Filename extension: .sol
- Developed by: Robert Fourer; David Gay; Brian Kernighan; Bell Labs
- Type of format: mathematical programming

sol is a file format for representing solutions of mathematical programming problems. It is often used in conjunction with the nl format to return solutions from the solvers. Initially this format has been invented for connecting solvers to AMPL but then it has been adopted by other systems such as FortSP for interacting with external solvers.

The sol format is low-level and is designed for compactness not for readability. It has both binary and textual representation. Many solvers such as CPLEX and MOSEK can produce files in this format either directly or through special driver programs.

The AMPL Solver Library (ASL) which allows among other things to read and write the sol files is open-source. It is used in many solvers to implement AMPL connection.

AMPL/MP Library contains an NL writer and SOL reader.

== See also ==
- nl (format) – a file format for presenting mathematical programming problems
