= Second-order cone programming =

Convex optimization problem

A second-order cone program (SOCP) is a convex optimization problem of the form

minimize $\ f^T x \$
subject to

$$\lVert A_i x + b_i \rVert_2 \leq c_i^T x + d_i,\quad i = 1,\dots,m$$
$$Fx = g \$$

where the problem parameters are $f \in \mathbb{R}^n, \ A_i \in \mathbb{R}^{{n_i}\times n}, \ b_i \in \mathbb{R}^{n_i}, \ c_i \in \mathbb{R}^n, \ d_i \in \mathbb{R}, \ F \in \mathbb{R}^{p\times n}$, and $g \in \mathbb{R}^p$. $x\in\mathbb{R}^n$ is the optimization variable. $\lVert x \rVert_2$ is the Euclidean norm and $^T$ indicates transpose.

The name "second-order cone programming" comes from the nature of the individual constraints, which are each of the form:

$$\lVert A x + b \rVert_2 \leq c^T x + d$$

These each define a subspace that is bounded by an inequality based on a second-order polynomial function defined on the optimization variable $x$; this can be shown to define a convex cone, hence the name "second-order cone". By the definition of convex cones, their intersection can also be shown to be a convex cone, although not necessarily one that can be defined by a single second-order inequality. See below for a more detailed treatment.

SOCPs can be solved by interior point methods and in general, can be solved more efficiently than semidefinite programming (SDP) problems. Some engineering applications of SOCP include filter design, antenna array weight design, truss design, and grasping force optimization in robotics. Applications in quantitative finance include portfolio optimization; some market impact constraints, because they are not linear, cannot be solved by quadratic programming but can be formulated as SOCP problems.

== Second-order cones ==
The standard or unit second-order cone of dimension $n+1$ is defined as

$$\mathcal{C}_{n+1}=\left\{ \begin{bmatrix} x \\ t \end{bmatrix} \Bigg| x \in \mathbb{R}^n,
t\in \mathbb{R}, \|x\|_2\leq t \right\}$$.

The second-order cone is also known by the names quadratic cone, ice-cream cone, or Lorentz cone. For example, the standard second-order cone in $\mathbb{R}^3$ is

$$\left\{(x,y,z) \Big| \sqrt{x^2 + y^2} \leq z \right\}$$.

The set of points satisfying a second-order cone constraint is the inverse image of the unit second-order cone under an affine mapping:

$$\lVert A_i x + b_i \rVert_2 \leq c_i^T x + d_i \Leftrightarrow
\begin{bmatrix} A_i \\ c_i^T \end{bmatrix} x + \begin{bmatrix} b_i \\ d_i \end{bmatrix} \in
\mathcal{C}_{n_i+1}$$

and hence is convex.

The second-order cone can be embedded in the cone of the positive semidefinite matrices since

$$||x||\leq t \Leftrightarrow \begin{bmatrix} tI & x \\ x^T & t \end{bmatrix} \succcurlyeq 0,$$

i.e., a second-order cone constraint is equivalent to a linear matrix inequality. The nomenclature here can be confusing; here $M\succcurlyeq 0$ means $M$ is a semidefinite matrix: that is to say

$$x^T M x \geq 0 \text{ for all } x \in \mathbb{R}^n$$

which is not a linear inequality in the conventional sense.

Similarly, we also have,

$$\lVert A_i x + b_i \rVert_2 \leq c_i^T x + d_i \Leftrightarrow
\begin{bmatrix} (c_i^T x+d_i)I & A_i x+b_i \\ (A_i x + b_i)^T & c_i^T x + d_i \end{bmatrix} \succcurlyeq 0$$.

== Relation with other optimization problems ==
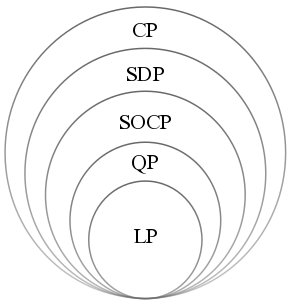
A hierarchy of convex optimization problems. (LP: linear program, QP: quadratic program, SOCP second-order cone program, SDP: semidefinite program, CP: cone program.)

When $A_i = 0$ for $i = 1,\dots,m$, the SOCP reduces to a linear program. When $c_i = 0$ for $i = 1,\dots,m$, the SOCP is equivalent to a convex quadratically constrained linear program.

Convex quadratically constrained quadratic programs can also be formulated as SOCPs by reformulating the objective function as a constraint. Semidefinite programming subsumes SOCPs as the SOCP constraints can be written as linear matrix inequalities (LMI) and can be reformulated as an instance of semidefinite program. The converse, however, is not valid: there are positive semidefinite cones that do not admit any second-order cone representation.

Any closed convex semialgebraic set in the plane can be written as a feasible region of a SOCP. However, it is known that there exist convex semialgebraic sets of higher dimension that are not representable by SDPs; that is, there exist convex semialgebraic sets that can not be written as the feasible region of a SDP (nor, a fortiori, as the feasible region of a SOCP).

== Examples ==
=== Quadratic constraint ===
Consider a convex quadratic constraint of the form

$$x^T A x + b^T x + c \leq 0.$$

This is equivalent to the SOCP constraint

$$\lVert A^{1/2} x + \frac{1}{2}A^{-1/2}b  \rVert \leq  \left(\frac{1}{4}b^T A^{-1} b - c \right)^{\frac{1}{2}}$$

=== Stochastic linear programming ===
Consider a stochastic linear program in inequality form

minimize $\ c^T x \$
subject to

$$\mathbb{P}(a_i^Tx \leq b_i) \geq p, \quad i = 1,\dots,m$$

where the parameters $a_i \$ are independent Gaussian random vectors with mean $\bar{a}_i$ and covariance $\Sigma_i \$ and $p\geq0.5$. This problem can be expressed as the SOCP

minimize $\ c^T x \$
subject to

$$\bar{a}_i^T x + \Phi^{-1}(p) \lVert \Sigma_i^{1/2} x \rVert_2 \leq b_i  , \quad i = 1,\dots,m$$

where $\Phi^{-1}(\cdot) \$ is the inverse normal cumulative distribution function.

=== Stochastic second-order cone programming ===
We refer to second-order cone programs as deterministic second-order cone programs since data defining them are deterministic. Stochastic second-order cone programs are a class of optimization problems that are defined to handle uncertainty in data defining deterministic second-order cone programs.

=== Other examples ===
Other modeling examples are available at the MOSEK modeling cookbook.

== Solvers and scripting (programming) languages ==
Name	License	Brief info
ALGLIB	free/commercial	A dual-licensed C++/C#/Java/Python numerical analysis library with parallel SOCP solver.
AMPL	commercial	An algebraic modeling language with SOCP support
Artelys Knitro	commercial	
CPLEX	commercial	
FICO Xpress	commercial	
Gurobi Optimizer	commercial	
MATLAB	commercial	The coneprog function solves SOCP problems using an interior-point algorithm
MOSEK	commercial	parallel interior-point algorithm
NAG Numerical Library	commercial	General purpose numerical library with SOCP solver

== See also ==
- Power cones are generalizations of quadratic cones to powers other than 2.
