= JaCoP (solver) =

JaCoP is a constraint solver for constraint satisfaction problems. It is written in Java and it is provided as a Java library. JaCoP has an interface to the MiniZinc and AMPL modeling languages. Its main focus is on ease of use, modeling power, as well as efficiency. It has a large collection of global constraints implemented to facilitate problem modeling. JaCoP is actively developed since year 2001. Krzysztof Kuchcinski and Radoslaw Szymanek are the core developers of this Java library. There are number of people who have contributed to JaCoP development in addition to core developers. JaCoP development has been influenced by more than 20 research articles from Constraint Programming community. It has been used as a tool in more than 30 research articles. There are many different examples provided so it is easier to learn how to use JaCoP.

The JaCoP project contains a wrapper for the Scala programming language, and a wrapper for Clojure is maintained as a separate project CloCoP.
