= FZN =

FZN or fzn may refer to:

- FZN (Dubai), restaurant owned by Björn Frantzén in Dubai, United Arab Emirates
- FZN, abbreviation for German Forschungszentrum Nachbergbau (Research Institute of Post-Mining), part of the Technische Hochschule Georg Agricola
- .fzn, file extension used by constraint modeling language MiniZinc
