= .sol =

.sol can refer to:

- sol (format), a file format for presenting solutions of mathematical programming problems
- Local shared object
- Solidity .sol source file for smart contracts that run on the Ethereum Virtual Machine
