= Quadratic programming =

Solving an optimization problem with a quadratic objective function

Quadratic programming (QP) is the process of solving certain mathematical optimization problems involving quadratic functions. Specifically, one seeks to optimize (minimize or maximize) a multivariate quadratic function subject to linear constraints on the variables. Quadratic programming is a type of nonlinear programming.

"Programming" in this context refers to a formal procedure for solving mathematical problems. This usage dates to the 1940s and is not specifically tied to the more recent notion of "computer programming." To avoid confusion, some practitioners prefer the term "optimization" — e.g., "quadratic optimization."

== Problem formulation ==
The quadratic programming problem with n variables and m constraints can be formulated as follows. Given:

- a real-valued, n-dimensional vector c,
- an n×n-dimensional real symmetric matrix Q,
- an m×n-dimensional real matrix A, and
- an m-dimensional real vector b,

the objective of quadratic programming is to find an n-dimensional vector x, that will

minimize	$\tfrac{1}{2} \mathbf{x}^\mathrm{T} Q\mathbf{x} + \mathbf{c}^\mathrm{T} \mathbf{x}$
subject to	$A \mathbf{x} \preceq \mathbf{b},$

where x^{T} denotes the vector transpose of x, and the notation Ax ⪯ b means that every entry of the vector Ax is less than or equal to the corresponding entry of the vector b (component-wise inequality).

=== Constrained least squares ===
As a special case when Q is symmetric positive-definite, the cost function reduces to least squares:

minimize	$\tfrac{1}{2} \| R \mathbf{x} - \mathbf{d}\|^2$
subject to	$A \mathbf{x} \preceq \mathbf{b},$

where Q = R^{T}R follows from the Cholesky decomposition of Q and c = −R^{T} d. Conversely, any such constrained least squares program can be equivalently framed as a quadratic programming problem, even for a generic non-square R matrix.

=== Generalizations ===
When minimizing a function f in the neighborhood of some reference point x_{0}, Q is set to its Hessian matrix H(f(x_{0})) and c is set to its gradient ∇f(x_{0}). A related programming problem, quadratically constrained quadratic programming, can be posed by adding quadratic constraints on the variables.

== Solution methods ==
For general problems a variety of methods are commonly used, including

- interior point,
- active set,
- augmented Lagrangian,
- conjugate gradient,
- gradient projection,
- extensions of the simplex algorithm.

In the case in which Q is positive definite, the problem is a special case of the more general field of convex optimization.

=== Equality constraints ===
Quadratic programming is particularly simple when Q is positive definite and there are only equality constraints; specifically, the solution process is linear. By using Lagrange multipliers and seeking the extremum of the Lagrangian, it may be readily shown that the solution to the equality constrained problem

$$\text{Minimize} \quad \tfrac{1}{2} \mathbf{x}^\mathrm{T} Q\mathbf{x} + \mathbf{c}^\mathrm{T} \mathbf{x}$$

$$\text{subject to} \quad E\mathbf{x} =\mathbf{d}$$

is given by the linear system

$$\begin{bmatrix}
Q & E^\top \\
E & 0
\end{bmatrix}
\begin{bmatrix} \mathbf x \\ \lambda \end{bmatrix}
=
\begin{bmatrix} -\mathbf c \\ \mathbf d \end{bmatrix}$$

where λ is a set of Lagrange multipliers which come out of the solution alongside x.

The easiest means of approaching this system is direct solution (for example, LU factorization), which for small problems is very practical. For large problems, the system poses some unusual difficulties, most notably that the problem is never positive definite (even if Q is), making it potentially very difficult to find a good numeric approach, and there are many approaches to choose from dependent on the problem.

If the constraints don't couple the variables too tightly, a relatively simple attack is to change the variables so that constraints are unconditionally satisfied. For example, suppose d = 0 (generalizing to nonzero is straightforward). Looking at the constraint equations:

$$E\mathbf{x} = 0$$

introduce a new variable y defined by

$$Z \mathbf{y} = \mathbf x$$

where y has dimension of x minus the number of constraints. Then

$$E Z \mathbf{y} = \mathbf 0$$

and if Z is chosen so that EZ = 0 the constraint equation will be always satisfied. Finding such Z entails finding the null space of E, which is more or less simple depending on the structure of E. Substituting into the quadratic form gives an unconstrained minimization problem:

$$\tfrac{1}{2} \mathbf{x}^\top Q\mathbf{x} + \mathbf{c}^\top \mathbf{x} \quad \implies \quad
\tfrac{1}{2} \mathbf{y}^\top Z^\top Q Z \mathbf{y} + \left(Z^\top \mathbf{c}\right)^\top \mathbf{y}$$

the solution of which is given by:

$$Z^\top Q Z \mathbf{y} = -Z^\top \mathbf{c}$$

Under certain conditions on Q, the reduced matrix Z^{T}QZ will be positive definite. It is possible to write a variation on the conjugate gradient method which avoids the explicit calculation of Z.

== Lagrangian duality ==
The Lagrangian dual of a quadratic programming problem is also a quadratic programming problem. To see this let us focus on the case where c = 0 and Q is positive definite. We write the Lagrangian function as

$$L(x,\lambda) = \tfrac{1}{2} x^\top Qx + \lambda^\top (Ax-b).$$

Defining the (Lagrangian) dual function g(λ) as $g(\lambda) = \inf_{x} L(x,\lambda)$, we find an infimum of L, using $\nabla_{x} L(x,\lambda)=0$ and positive-definiteness of Q:

$$x^* = -Q^{-1} A^\top \lambda.$$

Hence the dual function is

$$g(\lambda) = -\tfrac{1}{2} \lambda^\top AQ^{-1}A^\top \lambda - \lambda^\top b,$$

and so the Lagrangian dual of the quadratic programming problem is

$$\text{maximize}_{\lambda\geq 0} \quad  -\tfrac{1}{2} \lambda^\top AQ^{-1} A^\top \lambda - \lambda^\top b.$$

Besides the Lagrangian duality theory, there are other duality pairings (e.g. Wolfe, etc.).

== Run-time complexity ==
=== Convex quadratic programming ===
For positive definite Q, the minimization problem is convex. Hence, the ellipsoid method can be used to solve the problem in (weakly) polynomial time. This was explicitly shown in 1979 by Kozlov, Tarasov and Khachiyan.

Ye and Tse present a polynomial-time algorithm, which extends Karmarkar's algorithm from linear programming to convex quadratic programming. On a system with n variables and L input bits, their algorithm requires O(L n) iterations, each of which can be done using O(L n^{3}) arithmetic operations, for a total runtime complexity of O(L^{2} n^{4}).

Kapoor and Vaidya present another algorithm, which requires O(L * log L * n^{3.67} * log n) arithmetic operations.

=== Non-convex quadratic programming ===
When Q is not positive-definite (so the problem is non-convex), quadratic programming is NP-hard. One way to prove it is using the Motzkin-Straus theorem. It states that, for any undirected graph G, a certain quadratic program associated with G has a maximum that is function of the clique number of G. Computing the clique number of a graph is a well-known NP-hard problem; hence, solving the quadratic program is NP-hard too. Some important special cases are also NP-hard:

- Sahni proved NP-hardness for the case that Q is negative-definite (has n negative eigenvalues);
- Pardalos and Vavasis proved (strong) NP-hardness whenever Q has at least one negative eigenvalue. They do this by showing a reduction from the Clique problem to a particular quadratic program with varialbes w, x_{1}...x_{n}, y_{1,2}...y_{(n-1),n}, z and objective function z-w^{2}. They prove that the input graph has a clique of size k, if and only if the corresponding quadratic program has a solution with value 0.

Moreover, finding a KKT point of a non-convex quadratic program is CLS-hard.

== Mixed-integer quadratic programming ==
There are some situations where one or more elements of the vector x will need to take on integer values. This leads to the formulation of a mixed-integer quadratic programming (MIQP) problem. Applications of MIQP include water resources and the construction of index funds.

== Solvers and scripting (programming) languages ==
Name	Brief info
AIMMS	A software system for modeling and solving optimization and scheduling-type problems
ALGLIB	Dual licensed (GPL/proprietary) numerical library (C++, .NET).
AMPL	A popular modeling language for large-scale mathematical optimization.
APMonitor	Modeling and optimization suite for LP, QP, NLP, MILP, MINLP, and DAE systems in MATLAB and Python.
Artelys Knitro	An Integrated Package for Nonlinear Optimization
CGAL	An open source computational geometry package which includes a quadratic programming solver.
CPLEX	Popular solver with an API (C, C++, Java, .Net, Python, Matlab and R). Free for academics.
Excel Solver Function	A nonlinear solver adjusted to spreadsheets in which function evaluations are based on the recalculating cells. Basic version available as a standard add-on for Excel.
GAMS	A high-level modeling system for mathematical optimization
GNU Octave	A free (its licence is GPLv3) general-purpose and matrix-oriented programming-language for numerical computing, similar to MATLAB. Quadratic programming in GNU Octave is available via its qp command
HiGHS	Open-source software for solving linear programming (LP), mixed-integer programming (MIP), and convex quadratic programming (QP) models
IMSL	A set of mathematical and statistical functions that programmers can embed into their software applications.
IPOPT	IPOPT (Interior Point OPTimizer) is a software package for large-scale nonlinear optimization.
Julia	A high-level programming language with notable solving package being JuMP
Maple	General-purpose programming language for mathematics. Solving a quadratic problem in Maple is accomplished via its QPSolve command.
MATLAB	A general-purpose and matrix-oriented programming-language for numerical computing. Quadratic programming in MATLAB requires the Optimization Toolbox in addition to the base MATLAB product
Mathematica	A general-purpose programming-language for mathematics, including symbolic and numerical capabilities.
MOSEK	A solver for large scale optimization with API for several languages (C++, Java, .Net, Matlab and Python).
NAG Numerical Library	A collection of mathematical and statistical routines developed by the Numerical Algorithms Group for multiple programming languages (C, C++, Fortran, Visual Basic, Java and C#) and packages (MATLAB, Excel, R, LabVIEW). The Optimization chapter of the NAG Library includes routines for quadratic programming problems with both sparse and non-sparse linear constraint matrices, together with routines for the optimization of linear, nonlinear, sums of squares of linear or nonlinear functions with nonlinear, bounded or no constraints. The NAG Library has routines for both local and global optimization, and for continuous or integer problems.
ojAlgo	oj! Algorithms - ojAlgo - is Open Source Java code that has to do with mathematics, linear algebra and optimisation.
Python	High-level programming language with bindings for most available solvers. Quadratic programming is available via the solve_qp function or by calling a specific solver directly.
R (Fortran)	GPL licensed universal cross-platform statistical computation framework.
SAS/OR	A suite of solvers for Linear, Integer, Nonlinear, Derivative-Free, Network, Combinatorial and Constraint Optimization; the Algebraic modeling language OPTMODEL; and a variety of vertical solutions aimed at specific problems/markets, all of which are fully integrated with the SAS System.
SuanShu	an open-source suite of optimization algorithms to solve LP, QP, SOCP, SDP, SQP in Java
TK Solver	Mathematical modeling and problem solving software system based on a declarative, rule-based language, commercialized by Universal Technical Systems, Inc..
TOMLAB	Supports global optimization, integer programming, all types of least squares, linear, quadratic and unconstrained programming for MATLAB. TOMLAB supports solvers like CPLEX, SNOPT and KNITRO.
XPRESS	Solver for large-scale linear programs, quadratic programs, general nonlinear and mixed-integer programs. Has API for several programming languages, also has a modelling language Mosel and works with AMPL, GAMS. Free for academic use.

== Extensions ==
Polynomial optimization is a more general framework, in which the constraints can be polynomial functions of any degree, not only 2.

== See also ==
- Sequential quadratic programming
- Linear programming
- Critical line method
