= MPS (format) =

File format

MPS (Mathematical Programming System) is a file format for presenting and archiving linear programming (LP) and mixed integer programming problems.

== Overview ==
NEOS input statistics for January 2011.

The format was named after an early IBM LP product and has emerged as a de facto standard ASCII medium among most of the commercial LP solvers. Essentially all commercial LP solvers accept this format, and it is also accepted by the open-source COIN-OR system. Other software may require a customized reader routine in order to read MPS files. However, with the acceptance of algebraic modeling languages MPS usage has declined. For example, according to the NEOS server statistics in January 2011 less than 1% of submissions were in MPS form compared to 59.4% of AMPL and 29.7% of GAMS submissions.

MPS is column-oriented (as opposed to entering the model as equations), and all model components (variables, rows, etc.) receive names. MPS is an old format, so it is set up for punch cards: Fields start in column 2, 5, 15, 25, 40 and 50. Sections of an MPS file are marked by so-called header cards, which are distinguished by their starting in column 1. Although it is typical to use upper-case throughout the file for historical reasons, many MPS-readers will accept mixed-case for anything except the header cards, and some allow mixed-case anywhere. The names that you choose for the individual entities (constraints or variables) are not important to the solver; one should pick meaningful names, or easy names for a post-processing code to read.

== MPS format ==
Here is a little sample model written in MPS format (explained in more detail below):

NAME          TESTPROB
ROWS
 N  COST
 L  LIM1
 G  LIM2
 E  MYEQN
COLUMNS
    XONE      COST                 1   LIM1                 1
    XONE      LIM2                 1
    YTWO      COST                 4   LIM1                 1
    YTWO      MYEQN               -1
    ZTHREE    COST                 9   LIM2                 1
    ZTHREE    MYEQN                1
RHS
    RHS1      LIM1                 5   LIM2                10
    RHS1      MYEQN                7
BOUNDS
 UP BND1      XONE                 4
 LO BND1      YTWO                -1
 UP BND1      YTWO                 1
ENDATA

For comparison, here is the same model written out in an equation-oriented format:

Optimize
 COST:    XONE + 4*YTWO + 9*ZTHREE
Subject To
 LIM1:    XONE + YTWO          <= 5
 LIM2:    XONE        + ZTHREE >= 10
 MYEQN:        - YTWO + ZTHREE  = 7
Bounds
       XONE <= 4
 -1 <= YTWO <= 1
End

As mentioned below, the lower bound on XONE is either zero or -infinity, depending upon implementation, because it is not specified. Strangely, nothing in MPS format specifies the direction of optimization, and there is no standard "default" direction; some LP solvers will maximize if not instructed otherwise, others will minimize, and still others put safety first and have no default and require a selection somewhere in a control program or by a calling parameter. If the model is formulated for minimization and the solver requires maximization (or vice versa), it is easy to convert between the two by negating all coefficients of the objective function. The optimal value of the objective function will then be the negative of the original optimal value, but the values of the variables themselves will be correct. Some programs support specifying minimization/maximization within the MPS file.

OBJSENSE
 MAX

== MPS Sections ==
The NAME section starts with the word Name in columns 1-4 and the title for the problem in columns 15–21.

The optional OBJSENSE section defines if the LP problem is a maximization or minimization problem. This section is particularly useful when the default behavior (minimization) is not desired.

The ROWS section defines the names of all the constraints; entries in column 2 or 3 are E for equality ( = ) rows, L for less-than ( <= ) rows, G for greater-than ( >= ) rows, and N for non-constraining rows. The order of the rows named in this section is unimportant, except for non-constraining rows marked N, the first of which would be interpreted as the objective function.

The COLUMNS section contains the entries of the A-matrix. All entries for a given column must be placed consecutively, although within a column the order of the entries (rows) is irrelevant. Rows not mentioned for a column are implied to have a coefficient of zero.

The RHS section allows one or more right-hand-side vectors to be defined; there is seldom more than one. In the above example, the name of the RHS vector is RHS1, and has non-zero values in all 3 of the constraint rows of the problem. Rows not mentioned in an RHS vector would be assumed to have a right-hand-side of zero.

The optional RANGES specifies double-inequalities for the rows lower and upper bounds.

The optional BOUNDS section specifies lower and upper bounds on individual variables. The first 2-3 columns specify the bound type. Some of the common bounds are UP, LO, FX, FR, MI and PI. Where a bound of type UP means an upper bound is applied to the variable. A bound of type LO means a lower bound is applied. A bound type of FX ("fixed") means that the variable has upper and lower bounds equal to a single value. A bound type of FR ("free") means the variable has neither lower nor upper bounds and so can take on negative values. A variation on that is MI for free negative, giving an upper bound of 0 but no lower bound. Bound type PL is for a free positive from zero to plus infinity, but as this is the normal default, it is seldom used. Additionally, in some modifications of the mps file format there exists bound types for use in MIP models. Such as BV for binary, being 0 or 1. UI for upper integer and LI for lower integer. SC stands for semi-continuous and indicates that the variable may be zero, but if not must be equal to at least the value given. Variables not mentioned in a given BOUNDS set are taken to be non-negative (lower bound zero, no upper bound). Next the row label is in columns 5-12 followed by the column label in columns 14–22. With the value of the bound in columns 25–36.

A few special cases of the MPS standard are not consistently handled by implementations. In the BOUNDS section, if a variable is given a nonpositive upper bound but no lower bound, its lower bound may default to zero or to minus infinity (also, if the upper bound is given as zero, the lower bound might be zero or negative infinity). If an integer variable has no upper bound specified, its upper bound may default to one rather than to plus infinity.

Alternatively, some mps solvers allow other categories to enhance the functionality. such as Integrality markers to mark integer variables with keywords 'MARKER' 'INTORG', 'Marker' 'INTEND' or another section such as INTEGER. With many other custom categories for different solvers.

The ENDATA section signifies the end of the LP problem. This must be there

== Limitations ==
MPS has many limitations. It does not specify the direction of optimization which is handled differently by solvers. Numeric fields have 12 characters width therefore limiting the precision. The representation is neither easy for human interpretation nor compact (although reserves column / row order information, which is often beneficial for LP solver behaviour reproducibility). One of the alternatives to MPS that does not have its limitations and is supported by most solvers is the nl file format.

== Extensions ==
Many LP products include extensions to the MPS format. The free format MPS allows for long names and more accurate data by allowing fields to exceed the columns defined by the original standard, and apply whitespaces as separators instead of fixed column positions (note that this makes some MPS files that included whitespaces as part of names to be no longer valid). Some extensions include adding new kind of data to the MPS file (e.g. sections to include objective sense, integrality requirements, quadratic data or advanced MIP modelling constructs). There is also a compressed MPSC file format. SMPS is a specialized extension, designed to represent stochastic programming problem instances, in use especially in research environments.

Although some extensions are not standardized, the format is still in general use.

== See also ==
- Linear programming
- MPS file format – a description of the format by the authors of lp_solve
- xMPS – an extended MPS format
