= Biosphere3D =

- Developer(s): Zuse Institute Berlin, Lenné3D
- Initial release: May 21, 2007
- Stable release: 2024.0830.17 / August 31, 2024; 6 months ago
- Repository: sourceforge.net/projects/biosphere3d/
- Written in: C++
- Operating system: Windows
- Available in: English
- Type: Virtual globe
- License: MPL
- Website: biosphere3d.org

Biosphere3D is an open-source project that targets interactive landscape scenery rendering based on a virtual globe. The software system supports multiple scales but focuses primarily on the creation of realistic views from eye-level (First Person View) or near ground level. The software is released under the MPL license and developed by Zuse Institute Berlin, Lenné3D and the open-source community for use on personal computers.

== Overview ==
Biosphere3D was initially developed in the Visualization and Data Analysis department at the Zuse Institute Berlin as part of a research project and it was first released in 2007. Applications are in Landscape planning, Landscape architecture, visual impact assessment, e.g. of Wind farms, Power stations, Land use planning, Archaeology, Urban planning, and forestry enabling to wander through landscape scenarios or virtually reconstructed historical landscape and gardens. Biosphere3D, initially funded by the Federal Ministry of Education and Research (Germany) within the R&D project ‘SILVISIO’, has been designed as a pure landscape visualization system. Modeling of landscape features occurs in external applications such as Geographic information systems (GIS), simulation models with GIS data output, and 3D CAD tools such as SketchUp. Users can interact with the globe by rotating it, tilting the view, and zooming in and out. 3D scenes are composed based on the import of digital elevation model (DEM) data, image raster files, ESRI shapefiles, Collada and kml/kmz files, e.g. from SketchUp or Trimble 3D Warehouse.

The data structures used by Biosphere3D require no or short pre-processing steps; so all data can be modified on the fly with minimal turn around times. This facilitates quick 3D scene generation and a semi-interactive workflow.

See the Biosphere3D Help on how to get started with the software.

== Features ==
- any raster file format is supported, which can be read by the open source library GDAL
- models can be read from Collada, a Wavefront .obj file, Flora3D or kml/kmz files
- use ESRI shapefiles to distribute models and vegetation with OIX plant distribution files or with points or multi points; polygons are for water surfaces, simple extruded buildings and to draw textures on the ground
- reads and visualizes ENVI-met microclimate simulations
- exports Portable Network Graphics (PNG) and high dynamic range OpenEXR images in virtual resolutions as stills or videos from camera paths
- animate models on a path or with skeletal animation
- different camera modes to walk or fly through the scene, optional collision detection
- simple non-photorealistic rendering for models
- adjustable physics-based atmospheric scattering
- advanced visual effects such as anti-aliasing, screen space ambient occlusion, soft shadow mapping, depth of field, anaglyph 3D stereo rendering, water with waves and reflections, god rays
- is under constant development

== Computer requirements ==
Requirements depend on project size and used settings. A good starting point is a multi core processor, 8 GB RAM and a Graphics processing unit supporting OpenGL 4.0 with 2 GB memory. Large projects with detailed models and many textures may need 24 GB RAM and 11 GB graphic memory or more and a matching CPU. For the released beta on SourceForge, a x64 bit Windows with up-to-date drivers is needed. You can also use the OpenGL Extensions Viewer to verify that OpenGL 4.0 is supported.

== Community ==
Source code is OS portable (Source code to work with many OS platforms) but currently, only Windows x86 and x64 is supported. The source code is hosted as a git repository on SourceForge. Read-only access is available for everyone. Write access is granted on request.

== See also ==
- Google Earth
- NASA World Wind
- Geovisualization
- Interactive visualization
