= Lp solve =

Solver for linear programs

lp_solve
- Stable release: 5.5.2.11
- Written in: C
- Operating system: Cross-platform
- Available in: English
- License: LGPLv2.1
- Website: lpsolve.sourceforge.net/5.5/

lp_solve is a free software command line utility and library for solving linear programming and mixed integer programming problems. It ships with support for two file formats, MPS and lp_solve's own LP format. User-defined formats are supported via its "eXternal Language Interface" (XLI) lp_solve also supports translating between model formats using the -w series of command line switches

lp_solve uses the simplex method for linear programs, and branch-and-bound for mixed integer programs. Multiple pivoting strategies are supported, including devex. lp_solve also features a pre-solver that can remove redundant variables and remove or tighten constraints.

The lp_solve project also features an integrated development environment called LPSolve IDE, for Microsoft Windows.
