= CPLEX =

Optimization software package for linear programming

- Developer: IBM
- Stable release: 22.1.2
- Type: Technical computing
- License: Proprietary
- Website: www.ibm.com/products/ilog-cplex-optimization-studio

IBM ILOG CPLEX Optimization Studio (often informally referred to simply as CPLEX) is an optimization software package.

== History ==
The CPLEX Optimizer was named after the simplex method implemented in the C programming language. However, today it also supports other types of mathematical optimization and offers interfaces other than C. It was originally developed by Robert E. Bixby and sold commercially in 1988 by CPLEX Optimization Inc. This was acquired by ILOG in 1997 and ILOG was subsequently acquired by IBM in January 2009. CPLEX continues to be actively developed by IBM.

== Features ==
The IBM ILOG CPLEX Optimizer solves integer programming problems, very large linear programming problems using either primal or dual variants of the simplex method or the barrier interior point method, convex and non-convex quadratic programming problems, and convex quadratically constrained problems (solved via second-order cone programming, or SOCP).

The CPLEX Optimizer has a modeling layer called Concert that provides interfaces to the C++, C#, and Java languages. There is a Python language interface based on the C interface. Finally, a stand-alone Interactive Optimizer executable is provided for debugging and other purposes.

The CPLEX Optimizer is accessible through independent modeling systems such as AIMMS, AMPL, GAMS, OptimJ and TOMLAB. In addition to that AMPL provides an interface to the CPLEX CP Optimizer.

The full IBM ILOG CPLEX Optimization Studio consists of the CPLEX Optimizer for mathematical programming, the CP Optimizer for constraint programming, the Optimization Programming Language (OPL), and a tightly integrated IDE.

== Release history ==
Prior to IBM acquiring ILOG, the CPLEX team published a release history of CPLEX.

Version	Release date	Key Features
22.1.1	December, 2022	Python 3.7 support dropped, new solver parameter added.
22.1.0	March, 2022	Python 3.9 and 3.10 support added, new solver parameters added.
20.1	December, 2020	MIP performance improvements, new 'emphasis MIP 5' mode, etc.
12.10	December, 2019	MIP performance improvements and the addition of a generic branching callback to the other generic callbacks introduced in version 12.8.
12.9	March, 2019	Direct support for multiobjective optimization, callback functionality improvement.
12.8	December, 2017	Generic callback, API recorder to facilitate debugging, subMIP control parameters, Download and Go offering.
12.7	November, 2016	Automated Benders decomposition, modeling assistance tool, runseeds command to better assess performance variability.
12.6.2	June, 2015	Performance improvements (mainly for SOCP, MISOCP, non-convex QP), support for cloud based optimization.
12.6	December, 2013	Support for nonconvex QPs and MIQPs, distributed parallel MIP and more parallelism at the root node for MIPs..
12.5	October, 2012	MIP performance improvements, random seed parameter to address performance variability, remote object, duals for QCPs, deterministic tuning tool.
12.4	November, 2011	Deterministic time limit support, duals for SOCPs, quadratic expression API in Concert, performance improvements across all algorithms, but especially MIP.
12.3	June, 2011	Support for large nonzero counts that require 64 bit indexing, local optima for non-convex QP, and globalization.
12.2	June, 2010	More parallelism at the root node, deterministic parallel concurrent LP optimization, along with some additional barrier performance improvements and additional tools for diagnosing ill conditioned basis matrices in MIPs.
12.0	April, 2009	The first version after IBM acquired ILOG. Includes connectors for Python, MATLAB and Excel. Deterministic parallel barrier is also included.
11.0	October, 2007	Breakthrough performance gains for mixed integer programming (MIP) models and enhanced parallel MIP optimization. The MIP solution pool feature and the performance tuning utility are introduced.
10.0	January, 2006	Performance improvements in the primal simplex and barrier methods, as well as the MIP optimizer. Indicator constraints and solution polishing heuristics are introduced and improvements to infeasibility analysis are made.
9.0	December, 2003	Performance improvements in primal and dual simplex methods and the MIP optimizer. It includes ILOG Concert Technology for .NET users and support for quadratically constrained programs.
8.0	July, 2002	MIP performance improvements and support for mixed integer quadratic programs.
7.5	December, 2001	ILOG Concert Technology for Java users.
7.0	October, 2000	ILOG Concert Technology for C++ users.
6.5	March, 1999	Significant performance improvements in primal and dual simplex methods, and ILOG CPLEX Mixed Integer Optimizer.
6.0	April, 1998	Significant performance improvements in primal and dual simplex methods, and CPLEX Barrier Optimizer.
5.0	September, 1997	New memory model for easy C++ integration.
4.0.5	March, 1996	Parallel CPLEX Mixed Integer Solver is introduced.
4.0	December, 1995	Redesigned advanced programming interface (API) to allow thread-safe applications.
3.0.8	March, 1995	Parallel CPLEX Barrier Solver is introduced.
3.0	April, 1994	CPLEX Barrier Solver is introduced.
2.1	March, 1993	Introduction of CPLEX Presolve algorithms.
2.0	April, 1992	Performance improvements.
1.2	1991	Support for the dual simplex method and CPLEX Mixed Integer Optimizer.
1.0	1988	Primal Simplex Method

== See also ==
- FICO Xpress
- GLPK
- Gurobi Optimizer
- SCIP
