= Total dual integrality =

In mathematical optimization, total dual integrality is a sufficient condition for the integrality of a polyhedron. Thus, the optimization of a linear objective over the integral points of such a polyhedron can be done using techniques from linear programming.

A linear system $Ax\le b$, where $A$ and $b$ are rational, is called totally dual integral (TDI) if for any $c \in \mathbb{Z}^n$ such that there is a feasible, bounded solution to the linear program

$$\begin{align}
&&\max c^\mathrm{T}x \\
&& Ax\le b,
\end{align}$$

there is an integer optimal dual solution.

Edmonds and Giles showed that if a polyhedron $P$ is the solution set of a TDI system $Ax\le b$, where $b$ has all integer entries, then every vertex of $P$ is integer-valued. Thus, if a linear program as above is solved by the simplex algorithm, the optimal solution returned will be integer. Further, Giles and Pulleyblank showed that if $P$ is a polytope whose vertices are all integer valued, then $P$ is the solution set of some TDI system $Ax\le b$, where $b$ is integer valued.

Note that TDI is a weaker sufficient condition for integrality than total unimodularity.
