= Power cone =

Concept in linear algebra

In linear algebra, a power cone is a kind of a convex cone that is particularly important in modeling convex optimization problems. It is a generalization of the quadratic cone: the quadratic cone is defined using a quadratic equation (with the power 2), whereas a power cone can be defined using any power, not necessarily 2.

== Definition ==
The n-dimensional power cone is parameterized by a real number $0<r<1$. It is defined as:

$P_{n, r, 1-r} := \left\{ \mathbf{x}\in \mathbb{R}^n:~~x_1\geq 0,~~ x_2\geq 0,~~ x_1^r\cdot x_2^{1-r} \geq \sqrt{x_3^2 + \cdots + x_n^2} \right\}$

An alternative definition is

$P_{r, 1-r} := \left\{ \mathbf{x_1, x_2, x_3}:~~x_1\geq 0,~~ x_2\geq 0,~~ x_1^r\cdot x_2^{1-r} \geq |x_3| \right\}$

== Applications ==
The main application of the power cone is in constraints of convex optimization programs. There are many problems that can be described as minimizing a convex function over a power cone.
