= AIMMS =

Business analytics software company

- Designed by: Johannes J. Bisschop; Marcel Roelofs
- Developer: AIMMS B.V. (formerly named Paragon Decision Technology B.V.)
- First appeared: 1993
- Website: aimms.com

AIMMS (acronym for Advanced Interactive Multidimensional Modeling System) is a prescriptive analytics software company with offices in the Netherlands, United States, and Singapore.

It has two main product offerings that provide modeling and optimization capabilities across a variety of industries. The AIMMS Prescriptive Analytics Platform allows advanced users to develop optimization-based applications and deploy them to business users. AIMMS SC Navigator, launched in 2017, is built on the AIMMS Prescriptive Analytics Platform and provides configurable Apps for supply chain teams. SC Navigator provides supply chain analytics to non-advanced users.

== History ==
AIMMS B.V. was founded in 1989 by mathematician Johannes Bisschop under the name of Paragon Decision Technology. His vision was to make optimization more approachable by building models rather than programming. In Bisschop's view, modeling was able to build the bridge between the people who had problems and the people helping them solve those problems.

AIMMS began as a software system designed for modeling and solving large-scale optimization and scheduling-type problems.

AIMMS is considered to be one of the five most important algebraic modeling languages. Bisschop was awarded with INFORMS Impact Prize for his work in this language.

In 2003, AIMMS was acquired by a small private equity firm. This led to the creation of a partnership program, further technical investment and the evolution of the platform. In 2011, the company launched AIMMS PRO, a way to deploy applications to end-users who do not have a technical background. This was quickly followed by the ability to publish and customize applications using a browser so that decision support applications are available on any device.

The company grew and was in 2017 recognized as a top B2B technology in the Netherlands, and was named one of the fastest-growing companies in the Netherlands for the second consecutive year.

== AIMMS SC Navigator Platform ==
Along with a growing interest in embedded advanced analytics for supply chain management, AIMMS developed the AIMMS SC Navigator Platform to allow for supply chain analytics. It was launched in October 2017 with three initial cloud-based Apps: Supply Chain Network Design, Sales & Operations Planning and Data Navigator. In 2018 they added Center of Gravity and Product Lifecycle.

== AIMMS Prescriptive Analytics Platform ==
The AIMMS Prescriptive Analytics Platform consists of an algebraic modeling language, an integrated development environment for both editing models and creating a graphical user interface around these models, and a graphical end-user environment. AIMMS is linked to multiple solvers through the AIMMS Open Solver Interface. Supported solvers include CPLEX, MOSEK, FICO Xpress, CBC, Conopt, MINOS, IPOPT, SNOPT, KNITRO and CP Optimizer.

AIMMS features a mixture of declarative and imperative programming styles. Formulation of optimization models takes place through declarative language elements such as sets and indices, as well as scalar and multidimensional parameters, variables and constraints, which are common to all algebraic modeling languages, and allow for a concise description of most problems in the domain of mathematical optimization. Units of measurement are natively supported in the language, and compile- and runtime unit analysis may be employed to detect modeling errors.

Procedures and control flow statements are available in AIMMS for

- the exchange of data with external data sources such as spreadsheets, databases, XML and text files
- data pre- and post-processing tasks around optimization models
- user interface event handling
- the construction of hybrid algorithms for problem types for which no direct efficient solvers are available.

To support the re-use of common modeling components, AIMMS allows modelers to organize their model in user model libraries.

AIMMS supports a wide range of mathematical optimization problem types:

- Linear programming
- Quadratic programming
- Nonlinear programming
- Mixed-integer programming
- Mixed-integer nonlinear programming
- Global optimization
- Complementarity problems (MPECs)
- Stochastic programming
- Robust optimization
- Constraint programming

Uncertainty can be taken into account in deterministic linear and mixed integer optimization models in AIMMS through the specification of additional attributes, such that stochastic or robust optimization techniques can be applied alongside the existing deterministic solution techniques.

Custom hybrid and decomposition algorithms can be constructed using the GMP system library which makes available at the modeling level many of the basic building blocks used internally by the higher level solution methods present in AIMMS, matrix modification methods, as well as specialized steps for customizing solution algorithms for specific problem types.

Optimization solutions created with AIMMS can be used either as a standalone desktop application or can be embedded as a software component in other applications.

== Use in industry ==
AIMMS Prescriptive Analytics Platform is used in a wide range of industries including retail, consumer products, healthcare, oil and chemicals, steel production and agribusiness.

GE Grid uses AIMMS as the modeling and optimization engine of its energy market clearing software. Together with GE Grid, AIMMS was part of the analytics team of Midwest ISO that won the Franz Edelman Award for Achievement in Operations Research and the Management Sciences of 2011 for successfully applying operations research in the Midwest ISO energy market. In 2012, TNT Express, an AIMMS customer won the Franz Edleman Award for modernizing its operations and reducing its carbon footprint. The AIMMS platform was also used by the Dutch Delta team to develop and implement a new method for calculating the most efficient levels of flood protection for the Netherlands and won the Edelman prize in 2013.

== See also ==
- Algebraic modeling language
