= XPRESS =

XPRESS was a weekly tabloid newspaper. It was launched in the UAE on 15 March 2007. The magazine was published in Dubai by the Al Nisr Group as a sister paper to Gulf News. It was shut down in 2018 due to declining revenue.

== History ==
Work on XPRESS, then known as Project X, began in the basement of the Gulf News offices off Sheikh Zayed Road near Safa Park in early 2005. Rumours of the project leaked into the media over the following months, but the details, including its name, remained secret until its launch on 12 March 2007.

Initial media reports indicated that Al Nisr Media intended to publish XPRESS twice weekly, and hoped to obtain a licence to publish daily. However, it launched as a weekly.

The newspaper was designed by Mario Garcia, president of the Tampa-based Garcia Media, who described it as "a vibrant, contemporary newspaper totally created for the reader of the 'always on' culture".

Reception was mixed, with an Arabian Business review describing it as "a headache on every page" and accusing it of running parochial stories.

In March 2013, XPRESS launched an Abu Dhabi edition.
