= OptimJ =

- Paradigm: object-oriented
- Designed by: Ateji
- First appeared: 2006
- Website: www.Ateji.com

Influenced by
- Java

OptimJ is an extension for Java with language support for writing optimization models and abstractions for bulk data processing. The extensions and the proprietary product implementing the extensions were developed by Ateji which went out of business in September 2011. OptimJ aims at providing a clear and concise algebraic notation for optimization modeling, removing compatibility barriers between optimization modeling and application programming tools, and bringing software engineering techniques such as object-orientation and modern IDE support to optimization experts.

OptimJ models are directly compatible with Java source code, existing Java libraries such as database access, Excel connection or graphical interfaces. OptimJ is compatible with development tools such as Eclipse, CVS, JUnit or JavaDoc. OptimJ is available free with the following solvers: lp_solve, glpk, LP or MPS file formats and also supports the following commercial solvers: MOSEK, IBM ILOG CPLEX Optimization Studio.

== Language concepts ==
OptimJ combines concepts from object-oriented imperative languages with concepts from algebraic modeling languages for optimization problems. Here we will review the optimization concepts added to Java, starting with a concrete example.

== The example of map coloring ==
The goal of a map coloring problem is to color a map so that regions sharing a common border have different colors. It can be expressed in OptimJ as follows.

package examples;

// a simple model for the map-coloring problem
public model SimpleColoring solver lpsolve
{
  // maximum number of colors
  int nbColors = 4;

  // decision variables hold the color of each country
  var int belgium in 1 .. nbColors;
  var int denmark in 1 .. nbColors;
  var int germany in 1 .. nbColors;

  // neighbouring countries must have a different color
  constraints {
    belgium != germany;
    germany != denmark;
  }

  // a main entry point to test our model
  public static void main(String[] args)
  {
    // instantiate the model
    SimpleColoring m = new SimpleColoring();

    // solve it
    m.extract();
    m.solve();

    // print solutions
    System.out.println("Belgium: " + m.value(m.belgium));
    System.out.println("Denmark: " + m.value(m.denmark));
    System.out.println("Germany: " + m.value(m.germany));
  }
}

Readers familiar with Java will notice a strong similarity with this language. Indeed, OptimJ is a conservative extension of Java: every valid Java program is also a valid OptimJ program and has the same behavior.

This map coloring example also shows features specific to optimization that have no direct equivalent in Java, introduced by the keywords model, var, constraints.

== OR-specific concepts ==
=== Models ===
A model is an extension of a Java class that can contain not only fields and methods but also constraints and an objective function. It is introduced by the model keyword and follows the same rules as class declarations. A non-abstract model must be linked to a solver, introduced by the keyword solver. The capabilities of the solver will determine what kind of constraints can be expressed in the model, for instance a linear solver such as lp solve will only allow linear constraints.

public model SimpleColoring solver lpsolve

=== Decision variables ===
Imperative languages such as Java provide a notion of imperative variables, which basically represent memory locations that can be written to and read from.

OptimJ also introduces the notion of a decision variable, which basically represents an unknown quantity whose value one is searching. A solution to an optimization problem is a set of values for all its decision variables that respects the constraints of the problem—without decision variables, it would not possible to express optimization problems. The term "decision variable" comes from the optimization community, but decision variables in OptimJ are the same concept as logical variables in logical languages such as Prolog.

Decision variables have special types introduced by the keyword var. There is a var type for each possible Java type.

  // a var type for a Java primitive type
  var int x;

  // a var type for a user-defined class
  var MyClass y;

In the map coloring example, decision variables were introduced together with the range of values they may take.

  var int germany in 1 .. nbColors;

This is just a shorthand equivalent to putting a constraint on the variable.

=== Constraints ===
Constraints express conditions that must be true in any solution of the problem. A constraint can be any Java Boolean expression involving decision variables.

In the map coloring example, this set of constraints states that in any solution to the map coloring problem, the color of Belgium must be different from the color of Germany, and the color of Germany must be different from the color of Denmark.

  constraints {
    belgium != germany;
    germany != denmark;
  }

The operator != is the standard Java not-equal operator.

Constraints typically come in batches and can be quantified with the forall operator. For instance, instead of listing all countries and their neighbors explicitly in the source code, one may have an array of countries, an array of decision variables representing the color of each country, and an array boolean[][] neighboring or a predicate (a Boolean function) boolean isNeighbor().

constraints {
  forall(Country c1 : countries, Country c2 : countries, :isNeighbor(c1,c2)) {
    color[c1] != color[c2];
  }
}

Country c1 : countries is a generator: it iterates c1 over all the values in the collection countries.

:isNeighbor(c1,c2) is a filter: it keeps only the generated values for which the predicate is true (the symbol : may be read as "if").

Assuming that the array countries contains belgium, germany and denmark, and that the predicate isNeighbor returns true for the couples (Belgium , Germany) and (Germany, Denmark), then this code is equivalent to the constraints block of the original map coloring example.

=== Objectives ===
Optionally, when a model describes an optimization problem, an objective function to be minimized or maximized can be stated in the model.

== Generalist concepts ==
Generalist concepts are programming concepts that are not specific to OR problems and would make sense for any kind of application development. The generalist concepts added to Java by OptimJ make the expression of OR models easier or more concise. They are often present in older modeling languages and thus provide OR experts with a familiar way of expressing their models.

=== Associative arrays ===
While Java arrays can only be indexed by 0-based integers, OptimJ arrays can be indexed by values of any type. Such arrays are typically called associative arrays or maps. In this example, the array age contains the age of persons, identified by their name:

  int[String] age;

The type int[String] denoting an array of int indexed by String. Accessing OptimJ arrays using the standard Java syntax:

  age["Stephan"] = 37;
  x = age["Lynda"];

Traditionally, associative arrays are heavily used in the expression of optimization problems. OptimJ associative arrays are very handy when associated to their specific initialization syntax. Initial values can be given in intensional definition, as in:

int[String] age = { 
  "Stephan" -> 37,
  "Lynda"   -> 29 
};

or can be given in extensional definition, as in:

  int[String] length[String name : names] = name.length();

Here each of the entries length[i] is initialized with names[i].length().

=== Tuples ===
Tuples are ubiquitous in computing, but absent from most mainstream languages including Java. OptimJ provides a notion of tuple at the language level that can be very useful as indexes in combination with associative arrays.

  (: int, String :) myTuple = new (: 3, "Three" :);
  String s = myTuple#1;

Tuple types and tuple values are both written between (: and :).

=== Comprehensions ===
Comprehensions, also called aggregates operations or reductions, are OptimJ expressions that extend a given binary operation over a collection of values. A common example is the sum:

  // the sum of all integers from 1 to 10
  int k = sum { i | int i in 1 .. 10};

This construction is very similar to the big-sigma summation notation used in mathematics, with a syntax compatible with the Java language.

Comprehensions can also be used to build collections, such as lists, sets, multisets or maps:

  // the set of all integers from 1 to 10
  HashSet<Integer> s = `hashSet(){ i | int i in 1 .. 10};

Comprehension expressions can have an arbitrary expression as target, as in:

  // the sum of all squares of integers from 1 to 10
  int k = sum { i*i | int i in 1 .. 10};

They can also have an arbitrary number of generators and filters:

  // the sum of all f(i,j), for 0<=i<10, 1<=j<=10 and i!=j 
  int k = sum{ f(i,j) | int i : 10, int j : 1 .. 10, :i!=j }

Comprehension need not apply only to numeric values. Set or multiset-building comprehensions, especially in combination with tuples of strings, make it possible to express queries very similar to SQL database queries:

  // select name from persons where age > 18
  `multiSet(){ p.name | Person p : persons, :p.age > 18 }

In the context of optimization models, comprehension expressions provide a concise and expressive way to pre-process and clean the input data, and format the output data.

== Development environment ==
OptimJ is available as an Eclipse plug-in. The compiler implements a source-to-source translation from OptimJ to standard Java, thus providing immediate compatibility with most development tools of the Java ecosystem.

== OptimJ GUI and rapid prototyping ==
Since the OptimJ compiler knows about the structure of all data used in models, it is able to generate a structured graphical view of this data at compile-time. This is especially relevant in the case of associative arrays where the compiler knows the collections used for indexing the various dimensions.

The basic graphical view generated by the compiler is reminiscent of an OLAP cube. It can then be customized in many different ways, from simple coloring up to providing new widgets for displaying data elements.

The compiler-generated OptimJ GUI saves the OR expert from writing all the glue code required when mapping graphical libraries to data. It enables rapid prototyping, by providing immediate visual hints about the structure of data.

Another part of the OptimJ GUI reports in real time performance statistics from the solver. This information can be used for understanding performance problems and improving solving time. At this time, it is available only for lp_solve.

== Supported solvers ==
OptimJ is available for free with the following solvers lp_solve, glpk, LP or MPS file formats and also supports the following commercial solvers: Mosek, IBM ILOG CPLEX Optimization Studio.
