= AMPL =

Algebraic modeling language

- Paradigm: Multi-paradigm: declarative, imperative
- Designed by: Robert Fourer; David Gay; Brian Kernighan; Bell Labs
- Developer: AMPL Optimization, Inc.
- First appeared: 1985; 41 years ago
- Stable release: 20250901 / 1 September 2025; 12 months ago
- OS: Cross-platform: Linux, macOS, Solaris, AIX, Windows
- License: Proprietary (translator), free and open-source (AMPL Solver Library)
- Filename extensions: .mod, .dat, .run
- Website: www.ampl.com

Influenced by
- AWK, C

Influenced
- JuMP, Pyomo

AMPL (A Mathematical Programming Language) is an algebraic modeling language to describe and solve high-complexity problems for large-scale mathematical computing (e.g. large-scale optimization and scheduling-type problems). It was developed by Robert Fourer, David Gay, and Brian Kernighan at Bell Laboratories. AMPL supports dozens of solvers, both open source and commercial software, including CBC, CPLEX, FortMP, MOSEK, MINOS, IPOPT, SNOPT, KNITRO, and LGO. Problems are passed to solvers as nl files. AMPL is used by more than 100 corporate clients, and by government agencies and academic institutions.

One advantage of AMPL is the similarity of its syntax to the mathematical notation of optimization problems. This allows for a very concise and readable definition of problems in the domain of optimization. Many modern solvers available on the NEOS Server (formerly hosted at the Argonne National Laboratory, currently hosted at the University of Wisconsin, Madison) accept AMPL input. According to the NEOS statistics AMPL is the most popular format for representing mathematical programming problems.

== Features ==
AMPL features a mix of declarative and imperative programming styles. Formulating optimization models occurs via declarative language elements such as sets, scalar and multidimensional parameters, decision variables, objectives and constraints, which allow for concise description of most problems in the domain of mathematical optimization.

Procedures and control flow statements are available in AMPL for

- the exchange of data with external data sources such as spreadsheets, databases, XML and text files
- data pre- and post-processing tasks around optimization models
- the construction of hybrid algorithms for problem types for which no direct efficient solvers are available.

To support re-use and simplify construction of large-scale optimization problems, AMPL allows separation of model and data.

AMPL supports a wide range of problem types, among them:

- Linear programming
- Quadratic programming
- Nonlinear programming
- Mixed-integer programming
- Mixed-integer quadratic programming with or without convex quadratic constraints
- Mixed-integer nonlinear programming
- Second-order cone programming
- Global optimization
- Semidefinite programming problems with bilinear matrix inequalities
- Complementarity theory problems (MPECs) in discrete or continuous variables
- Constraint programming

AMPL invokes a solver in a separate process which has these advantages:

- User can interrupt the solution process at any time
- Solver errors do not affect the interpreter
- 32-bit version of AMPL can be used with a 64-bit solver and vice versa

Interaction with the solver is done through a well-defined nl interface.

== Availability ==
AMPL is available for many popular 32 & 64-bit operating systems including Linux, macOS, Solaris, AIX, and Windows. The translator is proprietary software maintained by AMPL Optimization LLC. However, several online services exist, providing free modeling and solving facilities using AMPL. A free student version with limited functionality and a free full-featured version for academic courses are also available.

AMPL also provides open-source APIs that enable integration with general-purpose programming languages. Official APIs are available for Python, R, C++, C#, MATLAB and Java, allowing users to generate, update, and solve models programmatically.

AMPL can be used from within Microsoft Excel via the SolverStudio Excel add-in.

The AMPL Solver Library (ASL), which allows reading nl files and provides the automatic differentiation, is open-source. It is used in many solvers to implement AMPL connection.

AMPL/MP provides another open-source library to build linear, mixed-integer, and Constraint Programming solvers, replacing ASL for those not requiring automatic differentiation.

== Status history ==
This table present significant steps in AMPL history.

Year	Highlights
1985	AMPL was designed and implemented
1990	Paper describing the AMPL modeling language was published in Management Science
1991	AMPL supports nonlinear programming and automatic differentiation
1993	Robert Fourer, David Gay and Brian Kernighan were awarded ORSA/CSTS Prize by the Operations Research Society of America, for writings on the design of mathematical programming systems and the AMPL modeling language
1995	Extensions for representing piecewise-linear and network structures
1995	Scripting constructs
1997	Enhanced support for nonlinear solvers
1998	AMPL supports complementarity theory problems
2000	Relational database and spreadsheet access
2002	Support for constraint programming
2003	AMPL Optimization LLC was founded by the inventors of AMPL, Robert Fourer, David Gay, and Brian Kernighan. The new company took over the development and support of the AMPL modeling language from Lucent Technologies, Inc.
2005	AMPL Modeling Language Google group opened
2008	Kestrel: An AMPL Interface to the NEOS Server introduced
2012	Robert Fourer, David Gay, and Brian Kernighan were awarded the 2012 INFORMS Impact Prize as the originators of one of the most important algebraic modeling languages.
2012	AMPL book becomes freely available online
2013	A new cross-platform integrated development environment (IDE) for AMPL becomes available
2015	New solver library MP
2017	AMPL becomes available within different programming languages through APIs.

== A sample model ==
A transportation problem from George Dantzig is used to provide a sample AMPL model. This problem finds the least cost shipping schedule that meets requirements at markets and supplies at factories.

set Plants;
set Markets;

# Capacity of plant p in cases
param Capacity{p in Plants};

# Demand at market m in cases
param Demand{m in Markets};

# Distance in thousands of miles
param Distance{Plants, Markets};

# Freight in dollars per case per thousand miles
param Freight;

# Transport cost in thousands of dollars per case
param TransportCost{p in Plants, m in Markets} :=
    Freight * Distance[p, m] / 1000;

# Shipment quantities in cases
var shipment{Plants, Markets} >= 0;

# Total transportation costs in thousands of dollars
minimize cost:
    sum{p in Plants, m in Markets} TransportCost[p, m] * shipment[p, m];

# Observe supply limit at plant p
s.t. supply{p in Plants}: sum{m in Markets} shipment[p, m] <= Capacity[p];

# Satisfy demand at market m
s.t. demand{m in Markets}: sum{p in Plants} shipment[p, m] >= Demand[m];

data;

set Plants := seattle san-diego;
set Markets := new-york chicago topeka;

param Capacity :=
    seattle   350
    san-diego 600;

param Demand :=
    new-york 325
    chicago  300
    topeka   275;

param Distance : new-york chicago topeka :=
    seattle        2.5      1.7     1.8
    san-diego      2.5      1.8     1.4;

param Freight := 90;

== Solvers ==
Here is a partial list of solvers supported by AMPL:

Solver	Supported problem types
APOPT	mixed integer nonlinear programming
Artelys Knitro	linear, quadratic and nonlinear programming
Bonmin	mixed integer nonlinear programming
BPMPD	linear and quadratic programming
COIN-OR CBC	mixed integer programming
COIN-OR CLP	linear programming
CONOPT	nonlinear programming
Couenne	mixed integer nonlinear programming (MINLP)
CPLEX	linear, quadratic, second-order cone and mixed integer programming
CPLEX CP Optimizer	constraint programming
FILTER	nonlinear programming
FortMP	linear, quadratic and mixed integer programming
Gecode	constraint programming
IPOPT	nonlinear programming
JaCoP	constraint programming
LGO	global and local nonlinear optimization
lp_solve	linear and mixed integer programming
MINOS	linear and nonlinear programming
MINTO	mixed integer programming
MOSEK	linear, mixed integer linear, quadratic, mixed integer quadratic, quadratically constrained, conic and convex nonlinear programming
Octeract Engine	All types of optimisation problems without differential or integral terms, including discontinuous problems with min and max elementary functions.
SCIP	mixed integer programming
SNOPT	nonlinear programming
Sulum	linear and mixed integer programming
WORHP	nonlinear programming
XA	linear and mixed integer programming
Xpress	linear and convex quadratic optimization and their mixed integer counterparts

== See also ==
- sol (format)
- GNU MathProg (previously known as GMPL) is a subset of AMPL supported by the GNU Linear Programming Kit
