= Gurobi Optimizer =

Optimization solver

- Type: Private
- Industry: Mathematical Optimization, Operations Research, Prescriptive Analytics, Decision Intelligence
- Founded: 2008
- Headquarters: Beaverton, Oregon
- Key people: Dr. Zonghao Gu, Dr. Edward Rothberg, and Dr. Robert Bixby
- Website: https://www.gurobi.com/

Gurobi Optimizer is a prescriptive analytics platform and a decision-making technology developed by Gurobi Optimization, LLC. The Gurobi Optimizer (often referred to as simply, “Gurobi”) is a solver, since it uses mathematical optimization to calculate the answer to a problem.

Gurobi is included in the Q1 2022 inside BIGDATA “Impact 50 List” as an honorable mention.

== History ==
Dr. Zonghao Gu, Dr. Edward Rothberg, and Dr. Robert Bixby founded Gurobi in 2008, coming up with the name by combining the first two letters of their last names. Gurobi is used for linear programming (LP), quadratic programming (QP), quadratically constrained programming (QCP), mixed integer linear programming (MILP), mixed-integer quadratic programming (MIQP), and mixed-integer quadratically constrained programming (MIQCP).

In 2016, Dr. Bistra Dilkina from Georgia Tech discussed how she uses Gurobi in the field of computational sustainability, to optimize movement corridors for wildlife, including grizzly bears and wolverines in Montana.

In 2018, The New York Times reported that the U.S. Census Bureau used Gurobi to conduct census block reconstruction experiments, as part of an effort to reduce privacy risks.

Since 2019, Gurobi is used by National Football League (NFL) to build its game schedule each year.

In 2020, Gurobi has partnered with GE Digital GE Grid Solutions, the University of Florida, and Cognitive Analytics on a project for planning and scheduling day-ahead electricity supply.

In 2021, DoorDash used Gurobi, in combination with machine learning, to solve dispatch problems.

In 2023, Air France used Gurobi to power its decision-support tool, which recommends optimal flight and aircraft assignments and can take constraints like fuel consumption and an aircraft’s flying hours into account.
