= Robert Fourer =

American computer programmer

Robert Fourer (born September 2, 1950) is a scientist working in the area of operations research and management science. He is currently President of AMPL Optimization, Inc and is Professor Emeritus of Industrial Engineering and Management Sciences at Northwestern University. Robert Fourer is recognized as being the designer of the popular modeling language for mathematical programming called AMPL.

Together with David M. Gay and Brian Kernighan he was awarded 1993 ORSA/CSTS Prize by the Computer Science Technical Section of the Operations Research Society of America, for writings on the design of mathematical programming systems and the AMPL modeling language. Robert Fourer was also awarded Guggenheim Fellowship for Natural Sciences in 2002. He was elected to the 2004 class of Fellows of the Institute for Operations Research and the Management Sciences.

Prior to the invention of AMPL, a series of articles by Fourer extended the Simplex algorithm to allow for the objective to be convex separable piecewise-linear. He also worked with Sanjay Mehrotra to solve indefinite linear systems arising in interior-point methods. Their method was more numerically stable than other methods previously proposed.

== Writings ==
AMPL: A Modeling Language for Mathematical Programming, 2nd Ed. (2003 with David Gay and Brian Kernighan)
