= General algebraic modeling system =

Mathematical optimization modeling system

GAMS
- Developer: GAMS Development Corporation
- Stable release: 54.3.0 / 17 August 2026 (3 days ago)
- Platform: Cross-platform
- Type: Algebraic Modeling Language (AML)
- License: Proprietary
- Website: www.gams.com

The general algebraic modeling system (GAMS) is a high-level modeling system for mathematical optimization. GAMS is designed for modeling and solving linear, nonlinear, and mixed-integer optimization problems. The system is tailored for complex, large-scale modeling applications and allows the user to build large maintainable models that can be adapted to new situations. The system is available for use on various computer platforms. Models are portable from one platform to another.

GAMS was the first algebraic modeling language (AML) and is formally similar to commonly used fourth-generation programming languages. GAMS contains an integrated development environment (IDE) and is connected to a group of third-party optimization solvers. Among these solvers are BARON, COIN-OR solvers, CONOPT, COPT Cardinal Optimizer, CPLEX, DICOPT, IPOPT, MOSEK, SNOPT, and XPRESS.

GAMS allows the users to implement a sort of hybrid algorithm combining different solvers. Models are described in concise, human-readable algebraic statements. GAMS is among the most popular input formats for the NEOS Server. Although initially designed for applications related to economics and management science, it has a community of users from various backgrounds of engineering and science.

== Timeline ==
- 1976 GAMS idea is presented at the International Symposium on Mathematical Programming (ISMP), Budapest
- 1978 Phase I: GAMS supports linear programming. Supported platforms: Mainframes and Unix Workstations
- 1979 Phase II: GAMS supports nonlinear programming.
- 1987 GAMS becomes a commercial product
- 1988 First PC System (16 bit)
- 1988 Alex Meeraus, the initiator of GAMS and founder of GAMS Development Corporation, is awarded INFORMS Computing Society Prize
- 1990 32 bit Dos Extender
- 1990 GAMS moves to Georgetown, Washington, D.C.
- 1991 Mixed Integer Non-Linear Programs capability (DICOPT)
- 1994 GAMS supports mixed complementarity problems
- 1995 MPSGE language is added for CGE modeling
- 1996 European branch opens in Germany
- 1998 32 bit native Windows
- 1998 Stochastic programming capability (OSL/SE, DECIS)
- 1999 Introduction of the GAMS Integrated development environment (IDE)
- 2000 End of support for DOS & Win 3.11
- 2000 GAMS World initiative started
- 2001 GAMS Data Exchange (GDX) is introduced
- 2002 GAMS is listed in OR/MS 50th Anniversary list of milestones
- 2003 Conic programming is added
- 2003 Global optimization in GAMS
- 2004 Quality assurance initiative starts
- 2004 Support for Quadratic Constrained programs
- 2005 Support for 64 bit PC Operating systems (Mac PowerPC / Linux / Win)
- 2006 GAMS supports parallel grid computing
- 2007 GAMS supports open-source solvers from COIN-OR
- 2007 Support for Solaris on Sparc64
- 2008 Support for 32 and 64 bit Mac OS X
- 2009 GAMS available on the Amazon Elastic Compute Cloud
- 2009 GAMS supports extended mathematical programs (EMP)
- 2010 GAMS is awarded the company award of the German Society of Operations Research (GOR)
- 2010 GDXMRW interface between GAMS and Matlab
- 2010 End of support for Mac PowerPC / Dec Alpha / SGI IRIX / HP-9000/HP-UX
- 2011 Support for Extrinsic Function Libraries
- 2011 End of support for Win95 / 98 / ME, and Win2000
- 2012 The Winners of the 2012 INFORMS Impact Prize included Alexander Meeraus. The prize was awarded to the originators of the five most important algebraic modeling languages.
- 2012 Introduction of Object Oriented API for .NET, Java, and Python
- 2012 The winners of the 2012 Coin OR Cup included Michael Bussieck, Steven Dirkse, & Stefan Vigerske for GAMSlinks
- 2012 End of support for 32 bit on Mac OS X
- 2013 Support for distributed MIP (Cplex)
- 2013 Stochastic programming extension of GAMS EMP
- 2013 GDXRRW interface between GAMS and R
- 2014 Local search solver LocalSolver added to solver portfolio
- 2014 End of support for 32 bit Linux and 32 bit Solaris
- 2015 LaTeX documentation from GAMS source (Model2TeX)
- 2015 End of support for Win XP
- 2016 New Management Team
- 2017 EmbeddedCode Facility
- 2017 C++ API
- 2017 Introduction of "Core" and "Peripheral" platforms
- 2018 GAMS Studio (Beta)
- 2018 End of support for x86-64 Solaris
- 2019 GAMS MIRO - Model Interface with Rapid Orchestration (Beta)
- 2019 End of support for Win7, moved 32 bit Windows to peripheral platforms
- 2019 Altered versioning scheme to XX.Y.Z
- 2020 Introduction of demo and community licensing scheme
- 2020 Official release of GAMS MIRO (Model Interface with Rapid Orchestration) for deployment of GAMS models as interactive applications
- 2021 Official release of GAMS Engine, the new solution for running GAMS jobs in cloud environments
- 2022 Official release of GAMS Engine SaaS, the hosted version of GAMS Engine
- 2023 Release of GAMSPy, a Python package that allows algebraic modelling in Python, using GAMS as a backend
- 2024 ISO27001 certification
- 2024 Purchase of CONOPT non-linear Solver IP by GAMS

== Background ==
The driving forces behind the development of GAMS were the users of mathematical programming who believed in optimization as a powerful and elegant framework for solving real life problems in science and engineering. At the same time, these users were frustrated by high costs, skill requirements, and an overall low reliability of applying optimization tools. Most of the system's initiatives and support for new development arose in response to problems in the fields of economics, finance, and chemical engineering, since these disciplines view and understand the world as a mathematical program.

GAMS’s impetus for development arose from the frustrating experience of a large economic modeling group at the World Bank. In hindsight, one may call it a historic accident that in the 1970s mathematical economists and statisticians were assembled to address problems of development. They used the best techniques available at that time to solve multi-sector economy-wide models and large simulation and optimization models in agriculture, steel, fertilizer, power, water use, and other sectors. Although the group produced impressive research, initial success was difficult to reproduce outside their well functioning research environment. The existing techniques to construct, manipulate, and solve such models required several manual, time-consuming, and error-prone translations into different, problem-specific representations required by each solution method. During seminar presentations, modelers had to defend the existing versions of their models, sometimes quite irrationally, because of time and money considerations. Their models just could not be moved to other environments, because special programming knowledge was needed, and data formats and solution methods were not portable.

The idea of an algebraic approach to represent, manipulate, and solve large-scale mathematical models fused old and new paradigms into a consistent and computationally tractable system. Using generator matrices for linear programs revealed the importance of naming rows and columns in a consistent manner. The connection to the emerging relational data model became evident. Experience using traditional programming languages to manage those name spaces naturally lead one to think in terms of sets and tuples, and this led to the relational data model.

Combining multi-dimensional algebraic notation with the relational data model was the obvious answer. Compiler writing techniques were by now widespread, and languages like GAMS could be implemented relatively quickly. However, translating this rigorous mathematical representation into the algorithm-specific format required the computation of partial derivatives on very large systems. In the 1970s, TRW developed a system called PROSE that took the ideas of chemical engineers to compute point derivatives that were exact derivatives at a given point, and to embed them in a consistent, Fortran-style calculus modeling language. The resulting system allowed the user to use automatically generated exact first and second order derivatives. This was a pioneering system and an important demonstration of a concept. However, PROSE had a number of shortcomings: it could not handle large systems, problem representation was tied to an array-type data structure that required address calculations, and the system did not provide access to state-of-the art solution methods. From linear programming, GAMS learned that exploitation of sparsity was key to solving large problems. Thus, the final piece of the puzzle was the use of sparse data structures.

Lines starting with an * in column one are treated as comments.

== A sample model ==
A transportation problem from George Dantzig is used to provide a sample GAMS model. This model is part of the model library which contains many more complete GAMS models. This problem finds a least cost shipping schedule that meets requirements at markets and supplies at factories.

Dantzig, G B, Chapter 3.3. In Linear Programming and Extensions. Princeton University Press, Princeton, New Jersey, 1963.

 Sets
      i   canning plants   / seattle, san-diego /
      j   markets          / new-york, Chicago, topeka / ;
 Parameters
      a(i)  capacity of plant i in cases
        /    seattle     350
             san-diego   600  /
      b(j)  demand at market j in cases
        /    new-york    325
             Chicago     300
             topeka      275  / ;
 Table d(i,j)  distance in thousands of miles
                   new-york       Chicago      topeka
     seattle          2.5           1.7          1.8
     san-diego        2.5           1.8          1.4  ;
 Scalar f  freight in dollars per case per thousand miles  /90/ ;
 Parameter c(i,j)  transport cost in thousands of dollars per case ;
           c(i,j) = f * d(i,j) / 1000 ;
 Variables
      x(i,j)  shipment quantities in cases
      z       total transportation costs in thousands of dollars ;
 Positive Variable x ;
 Equations
      cost        define objective function
      supply(i)   observe supply limit at plant i
      demand(j)   satisfy demand at market j ;
 cost ..        z  =e=  sum((i,j), c(i,j)*x(i,j)) ;
 supply(i) ..   sum(j, x(i,j))  =l=  a(i) ;
 demand(j) ..   sum(i, x(i,j))  =g=  b(j) ;
 Model transport /all/ ;
 Solve transport using lp minimizing z ;
 Display x.l, x.m ;

== Subsystems ==
The Mathematical Programming System for General Equilibrium analysis (MPSGE) is a language used for formulating and solving Arrow–Debreu economic equilibrium models and exists as a subsystem within GAMS.

== See also ==
- Extended Mathematical Programming (EMP) – an extension to mathematical programming languages available within GAMS
- GNU MathProg – an open-source mathematical programming language based on AMPL
