= GNU Linear Programming Kit =

Software package

- Original author: Andrew O. Makhorin
- Developer: GNU Project
- Stable release: 5.0 / 16 December 2020; 5 years ago
- Written in: C
- Operating system: Cross-platform
- Available in: English
- License: GPLv3
- Website: www.gnu.org/software/glpk/
- Repository: salsa.debian.org/science-team/glpk.git

The GNU Linear Programming Kit (GLPK) is a software package intended for solving large-scale linear programming (LP), mixed integer programming (MIP), and other related problems. It is a set of routines written in ANSI C and organized in the form of a callable library. The package is part of the GNU Project and is released under the GNU General Public License.

GLPK uses the revised simplex method and the primal-dual interior point method for non-integer problems and the branch-and-bound algorithm together with Gomory's mixed integer cuts for (mixed) integer problems.

== History ==
GLPK was developed by Andrew O. Makhorin (Андрей Олегович Махорин) of the Moscow Aviation Institute. The first public release was in October 2000.

- Version 1.1.1 contained a library for a revised primal and dual simplex algorithm.
- Version 2.0 introduced an implementation of the primal-dual interior point method.
- Version 2.2 added branch and bound solving of mixed integer problems.
- Version 2.4 added a first implementation of the GLPK/L modeling language.
- Version 4.0 replaced GLPK/L by the GNU MathProg modeling language, which is a subset of the AMPL modeling language.

== Interfaces and wrappers ==
Since version 4.0, GLPK problems can be modeled using GNU MathProg (GMPL), a subset of the AMPL modeling language used only by GLPK. However, GLPK is most commonly called from other programming languages. Wrappers exist for:

- Julia and the JuMP modeling package
- Java (using OptimJ)
