= MOSEK =

Optimization software package

- Developer(s): Mosek ApS
- Stable release: 11.0
- Type: Mathematical optimization
- License: Proprietary
- Website: www.mosek.com

MOSEK is a software package for the solution of linear, mixed-integer linear, quadratic, mixed-integer quadratic, quadratically constrained, conic and convex nonlinear mathematical optimization problems. The applicability of the solver varies widely and is commonly used for solving problems in areas such as engineering, finance and computer science.

The emphasis in MOSEK is on solving large-scale sparse problems linear and conic optimization problems. In particular, MOSEK solves conic quadratic (a.k.a. Second-order cone programming) and semi-definite (aka. semidefinite programming) problems.

A special feature of the solver, is its interior-point optimizer, based on the so-called homogeneous model. This implies that MOSEK can reliably detect a primal and/or dual infeasible status as documented in several published papers.

In addition to the interior-point optimizer MOSEK includes:

- Primal and dual simplex optimizer for linear problems.
- Mixed-integer optimizer for linear, quadratic and conic problems.

In version 9, Mosek introduced support for exponential and power cones in its solver. It has interfaces to the C, C#, Java, MATLAB, Python and R languages. Major modeling systems are made compatible with MOSEK, examples are: AMPL, GAMS and CVXPY. In 2020 the solver also became available in Wolfram Mathematica.

In addition, Mosek can for instance be used with the popular MATLAB packages CVX, and YALMIP.

The MOSEK software was developed by Mosek ApS, a Danish company established in 1997 by Erling D. Andersen. The headquarter of Mosek is located in Copenhagen, the capital of Denmark.
