= Dantzig Prize =

Mathematical programming award

The Dantzig Prize is given every three years to one or more individuals for research which, by virtue of its originality, breadth, and depth, has a major impact on the field of mathematical programming. It is named in honor of George B. Dantzig and is awarded jointly by the Society for Industrial and Applied Mathematics (SIAM) and the Mathematical Optimization Society (MOS). The prize fund was established in 1979, and the prize first awarded in 1982.

== Recipients ==
The recipients of the Dantzig Prize are:

- 1982: Michael J.D. Powell, R. Tyrell Rockafellar
- 1985: Ellis Johnson, Manfred Padberg
- 1988: Michael J. Todd
- 1991: Martin Grotschel, Arkady S. Nemirovskii
- 1994: Claude Lemarechal, Roger J.B. Wets
- 1997: Roger Fletcher, Stephen M. Robinson
- 2000: Yurii Nesterov
- 2003: Jong-Shi Pang, Alexander Schrijver
- 2006: Éva Tardos
- 2009: Gérard Cornuéjols
- 2012: Jorge Nocedal, Laurence Wolsey
- 2015: Dimitri P. Bertsekas
- 2018: Andrzej Piotr Ruszczyński, Alexander Shapiro
- 2021: Hedy Attouch, Michel Goemans
- 2024: Stephen Wright

== See also ==
- List of mathematics awards
