= Cunningham's rule =

Concept in mathematical optimisation

In mathematical optimization, Cunningham's rule (also known as least recently considered rule or round-robin rule) is an algorithmic refinement of the simplex method for linear optimization.

The rule was proposed 1979 by W. H. Cunningham to defeat the deformed hypercube constructions by Klee and Minty et al. (see, e.g. Klee–Minty cube).

Cunningham's rule assigns a cyclic order to the variables and remembers the last variable to enter the basis. The next entering variable is chosen to be the first allowable candidate starting from the last chosen variable and following the given circular order. History-based rules defeat the deformed hypercube constructions because they tend to average out how many times a variable pivots.

It has recently been shown by David Avis and Oliver Friedmann that there is a family of linear programs on which the simplex algorithm equipped with Cunningham's rule requires exponential time.
