= Darinka Dentcheva =

Bulgarian-American mathematician

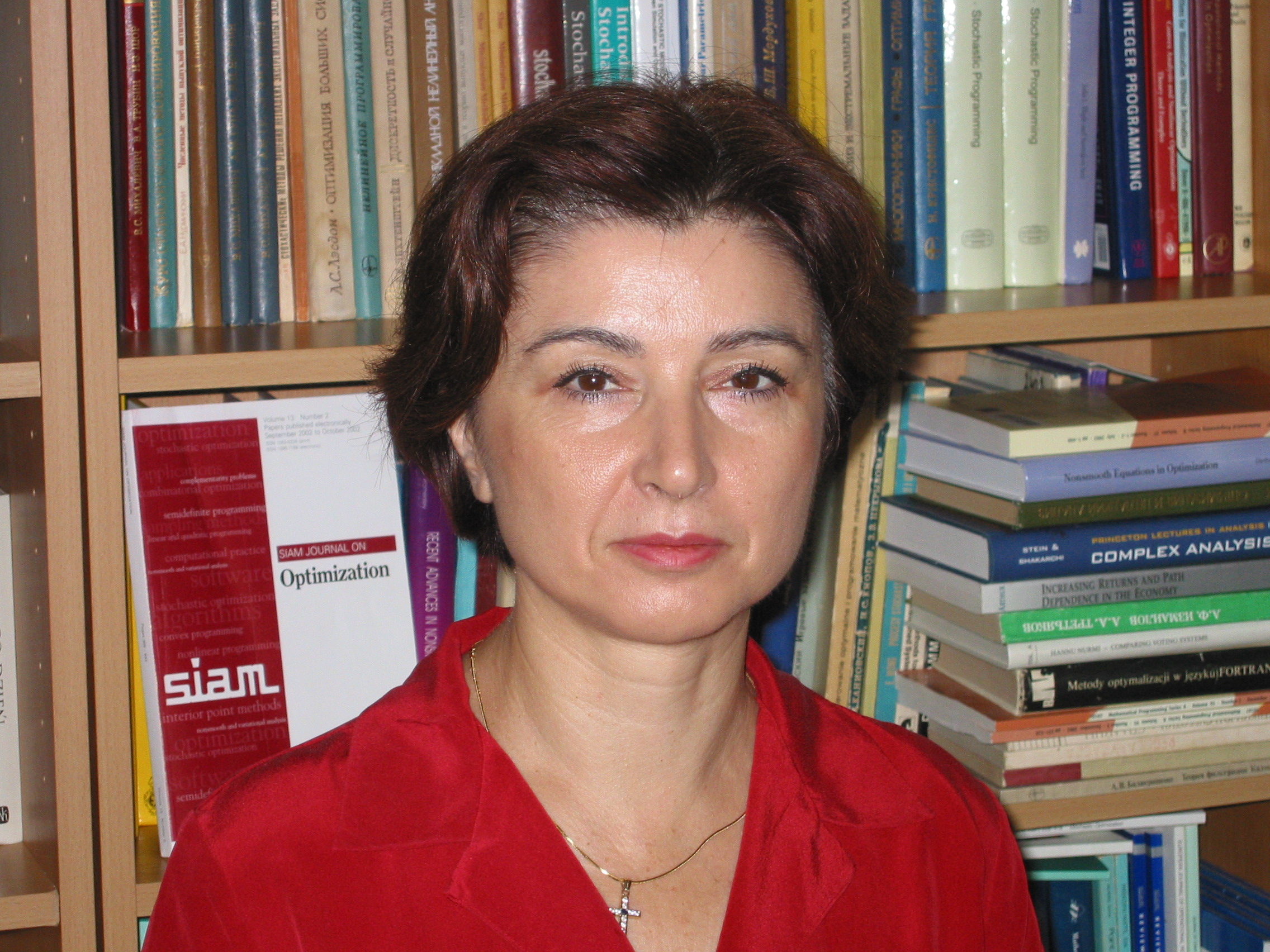
- Citizenship: United States
- Education: Humboldt University, Berlin, Germany
- Known for: Stochastic programming, Risk-Averse Optimization
- Scientific career
- Fields: Mathematical optimization
- Doctoral advisor: Jürgen Guddat

Darinka Dentcheva (Bulgarian: Даринка Денчева) is a Bulgarian-American mathematician, noted for her contributions to convex analysis, stochastic programming, and risk-averse optimization.

== Schooling and positions ==
Dentcheva was born in Bulgaria. She received her MsC and PhD degrees in mathematics from Humboldt University of Berlin (Germany) in 1981 and 1989, respectively. In 2006 she was granted Habilitation from Humboldt University of Berlin, for a dissertation on set-valued analysis.

From 1982 to 1994 Dentcheva was with the Institute of Mathematics, Bulgarian Academy of Sciences, in Sofia (Bulgaria). In 1997–1999 she was a visitor at the Rutgers Center for Operations Research of Rutgers University. In 1999–2000 she was a visiting professor at the Department of Industrial and Manufacturing Systems Engineering, Lehigh University. Since 2000 Dentcheva has been with Stevens Institute of Technology, where she holds a position of Professor at the Department of Mathematical Sciences. In 2023-2024 she was the Chair of the Faculty Senate.

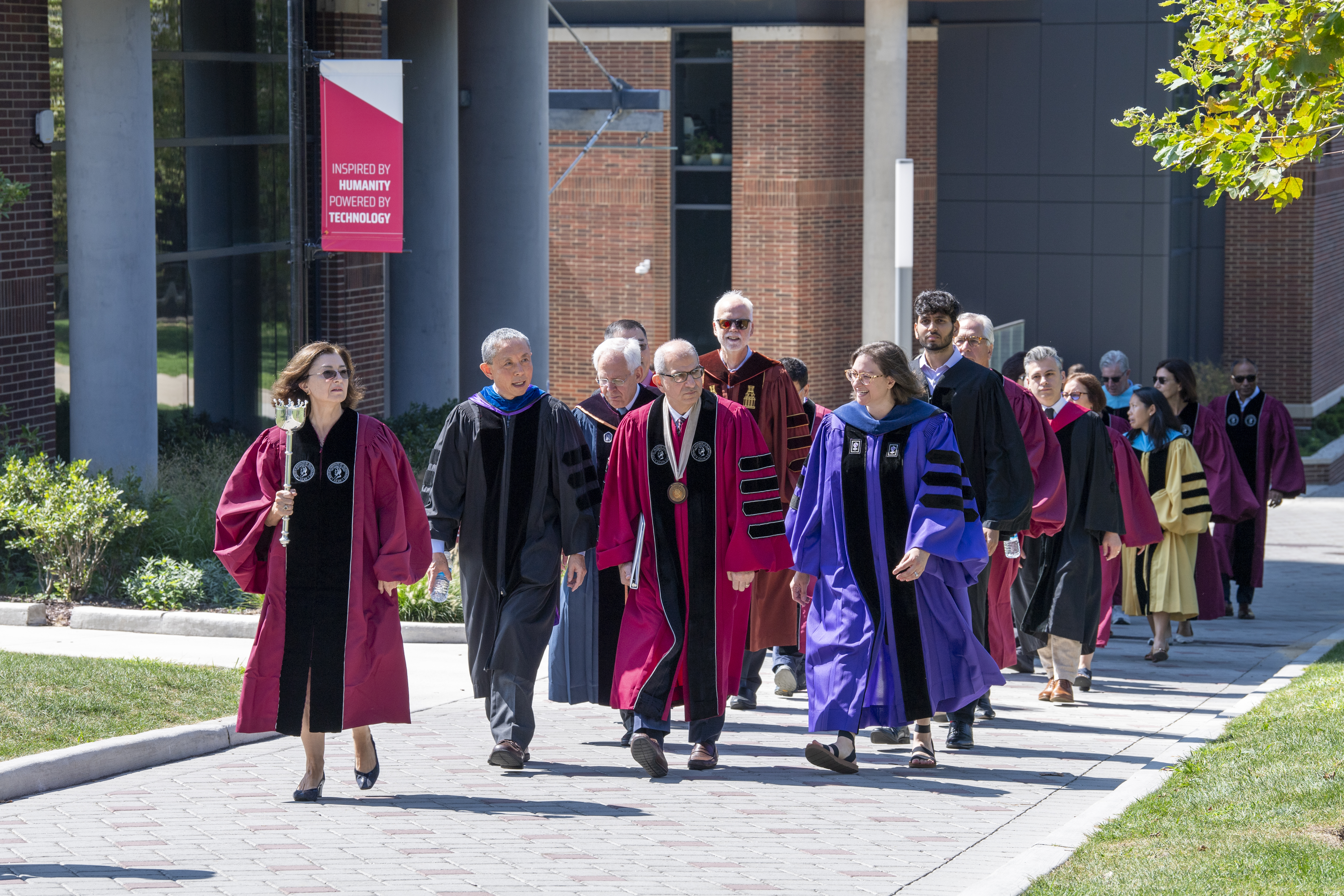
Dentcheva as the Faculty Marshal at the 2023 Convocation Ceremony at the Stevens Institute of Technology.

== Main achievements ==
Dentcheva developed the theory of Steiner selections of multifunctions, the theory of stochastic dominance constraints (jointly with Andrzej Ruszczyński), and contributed to the theory of unit commitment in power systems (with Werner Römisch). She authored 2 books and more than 70 research papers.

== Most important publications ==
- Dentcheva, Darinka; Ruszczyński, Andrzej (2024). Risk-Averse Optimization. Theory and Methods. Springer Series in Operations Research and Financial Engineering. Cham, Switzerland: Springer Nature. pp. xv+451. ISBN 978-3-031-57987-5.
- Shapiro, Alexander; Dentcheva, Darinka; Ruszczyński, Andrzej (2009). Lectures on stochastic programming. Modeling and theory. MPS/SIAM Series on Optimization. Vol. 9. Philadelphia: Society for Industrial and Applied Mathematics. pp. xvi+436. ISBN 978-0898716870. MR 2562798.
- Dentcheva, D.; and Ruszczyński, A., Optimization with stochastic dominance constraints, SIAM Journal on Optimization 14 (2003) 548–566.
- Dentcheva, D.; Prékopa, A.; Ruszczyński, A., Concavity and efficient points of discrete distributions in probabilistic programming, Mathematical Programming 89, 2000, 55–77.
- Dentcheva, D.; Römisch, W., Optimal power generation under uncertainty via stochastic programming, in: Stochastic Programming Methods and Technical Applications (K. Marti and P. Kall Eds.), Lecture Notes in Economics and Mathematical Systems, Springer Verlag, 1998.
- Dentcheva, D.; Helbig, S., On variational principles, level sets, well-posedness, and ∈-solutions in vector optimization, Journal of Optimization Theory and Applications 89, 1996, 325–349.
