= Andrzej Piotr Ruszczyński =

Polish-American mathematician (born 1951)

Andrzej P. Ruszczyński
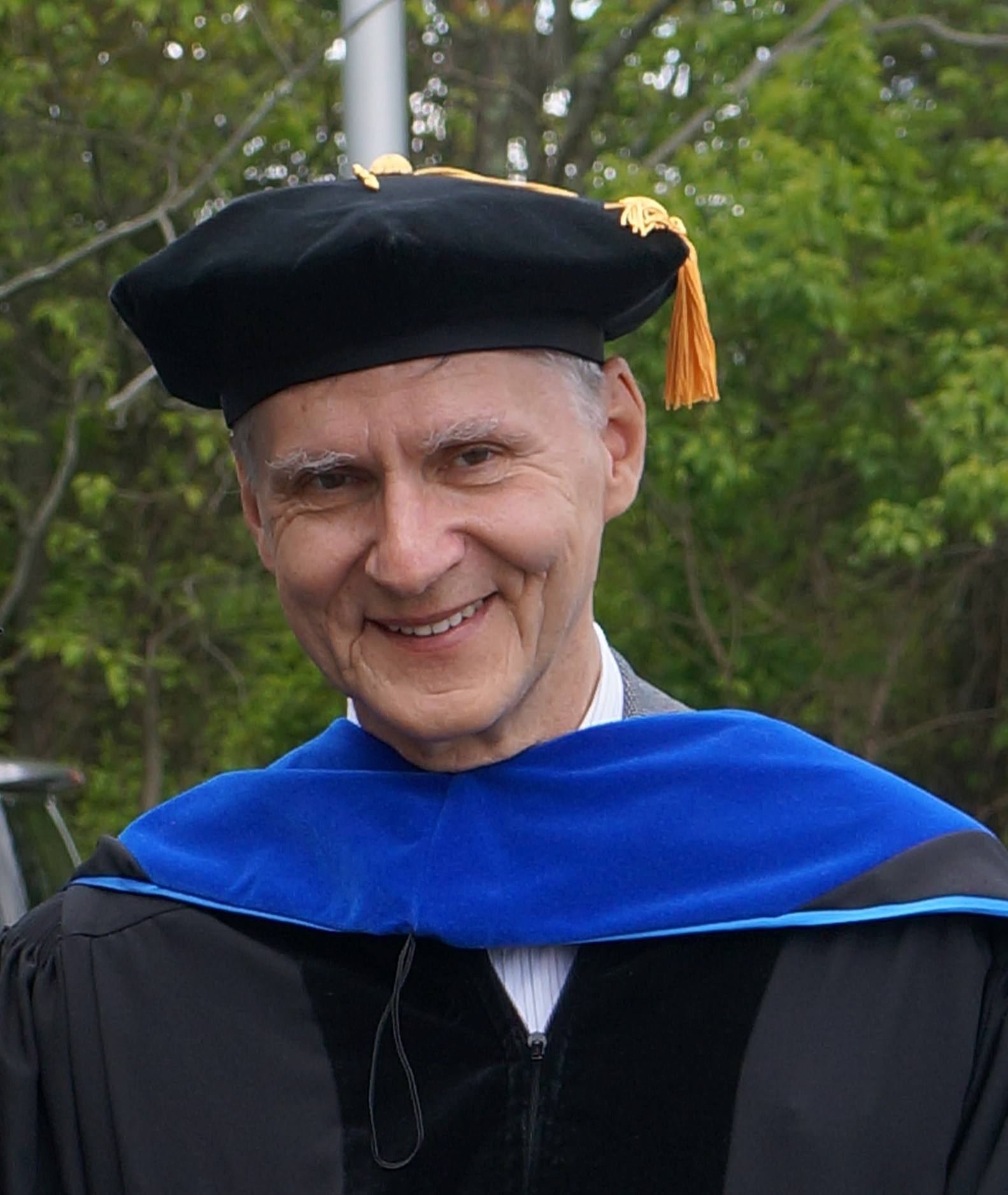
- Ruszczyński in 2017
- Education: Politechnika Warszawska, Warsaw, Poland
- Known for: Stochastic programming, risk-averse optimization
- Awards: Dantzig Prize (2018)
- Scientific career
- Fields: Mathematical optimization
- Doctoral advisor: Jacek Szymanowski

Andrzej Piotr Ruszczyński (born July 29, 1951) is a Polish-American applied mathematician, noted for his contributions to mathematical optimization, in particular, stochastic programming and risk-averse optimization.

== Schooling and positions ==
Ruszczyński was born and educated in Poland. In 1969 he won the XX Polish Mathematical Olympiad. After graduating in 1974 with a master's degree from the Department of Electronics, Warsaw University of Technology, he joined the Institute of Automatic Control at this school. In 1977 he received his PhD degree for a dissertation on the control of large-scale systems, and in 1983 Habilitation, for a dissertation on nonlinear stochastic programming. In 1992 the President of Poland, Lech Wałęsa, awarded Ruszczyński the state title of Professor. In 1984-86 Ruszczyński was a visiting scholar at the Institute for Operations Research, University of Zurich. In 1986-87 he was the vice-director of the Institute of Automatic Control, and in 1987-1990 he was the Vice-Dean of the Department of Electronics, Warsaw University of Technology. In 1992 Ruszczyński was a visiting professor at the Department of Operations Research, Princeton University, in 1992-96 he led the project Optimization under Uncertainty at the International Institute for Applied Systems Analysis, in 1996-97 he was a visiting professor at the Department of Industrial Engineering, University of Wisconsin-Madison, and since 1997 he has been with Rutgers University, where he holds a position of the Board of Governors Professor at the Rutgers Business School.

== Main achievements ==
Ruszczyński developed the theory of stochastic dominance constraints (jointly with Darinka Dentcheva), contributed to the theory of coherent, conditional, and dynamic risk measures (jointly with Alexander Shapiro), created the theory of Markov risk measures, and proposed new decomposition methods for stochastic programming problems. He authored five books and more than 100 research papers.

He was elected to the 2017 class of Fellows of the Institute for Operations Research and the Management Sciences. In 2018 Ruszczyński (jointly with A. Shapiro) received the Dantzig Prize of the Society for Industrial and Applied Mathematics and the Mathematical Optimization Society.

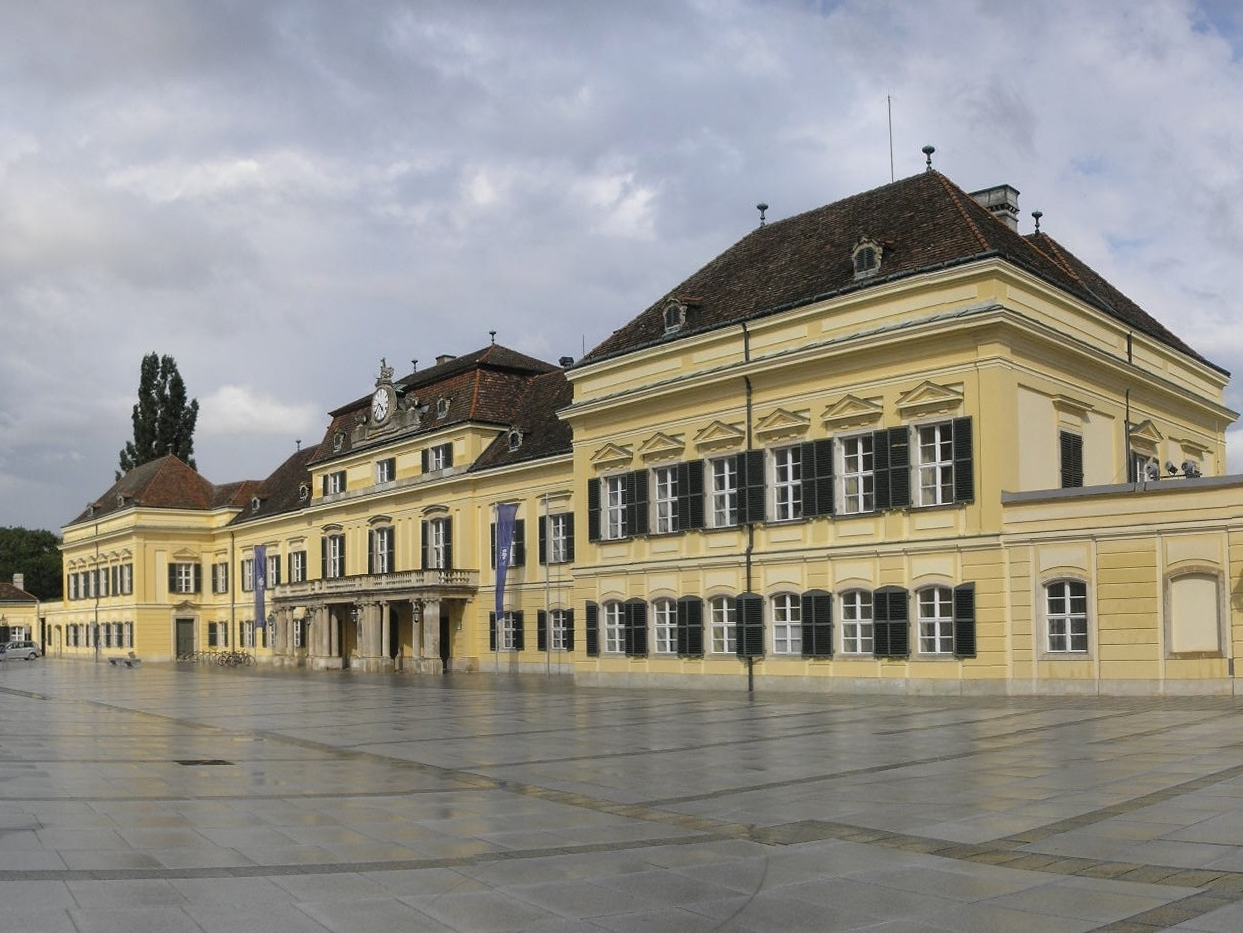
Ruszczyński led a project Optimization under Uncertainty at the International Institute for Applied Systems Analysis (pictured).

=== Selected books ===
- Ruszczyński, Andrzej; Shapiro, Alexander (2003). Stochastic Programming. Handbooks in Operations Research and Management Science. Vol. 10. Philadelphia: Elsevier. p. 700. ISBN 978-0444508546.
- Ruszczyński, Andrzej (2006). Nonlinear Optimization. Princeton, NJ: Princeton University Press. pp. xii+454. ISBN 978-0691119151. MR 2199043.
- Shapiro, Alexander; Dentcheva, Darinka; Ruszczyński, Andrzej (2009). Lectures on stochastic programming. Modeling and theory. MPS/SIAM Series on Optimization. Vol. 9. Philadelphia: Society for Industrial and Applied Mathematics. pp. xvi+436. ISBN 978-0898716870. MR 2562798.
- Dentcheva, Darinka; Ruszczyński, Andrzej (2024). Risk-Averse Optimization. Theory and Methods. Springer Series in Operations Research and Financial Engineering. Cham, Switzerland: Springer Nature. pp. xv+451. ISBN 978-3-031-57987-5.

=== Most influential papers ===
- Ruszczyński, Andrzej (1986). "A regularized decomposition method for minimizing a sum of polyhedral functions". Mathematical Programming. 35: 309–333. doi:10.1007/BF01580883.
- Mulvey, John M.; Ruszczyński, Andrzej (1995). "A new scenario decomposition method for large-scale stochastic optimization". Operations Research. 43 (3): 477–490. doi:10.1287/opre.43.3.477.
- Ogryczak, Włodzimierz; Ruszczyński, Andrzej (2002). "Dual stochastic dominance and related mean—risk models". SIAM Journal on Optimization. 13: 60–78. doi:10.1137/S1052623400375075.
- Dentcheva, Darinka; Ruszczyński, Andrzej (2003). "Optimization with stochastic dominance constraints". SIAM Journal on Optimization. 14: 548–566. doi:10.1137/S105262340242052.
- Ruszczyński, Andrzej; Shapiro, Alexander (2006). "Optimization of convex risk functions". Mathematics of Operations Research. 31 (3): 433–452. doi:10.1287/moor.1050.0186.
- Ruszczyński, Andrzej (2010). "Risk-averse dynamic programming for Markov decision processes". Mathematical Programming. Series B. 125: 235–261. doi:10.1007/s10107-010-0393-3.

== Chess composition ==
Piotr Ruszczyński
1st Prize, Szachy, 1972

Position: d8 black knight, b6 white pawn, d6 white rook, b5 black rook, f5 white pawn, h5 black queen, c4 black king, d4 white knight, h4 white rook, a3 white queen, e3 white bishop, g3 white pawn, h3 black pawn, b2 black knight, e2 white knight, d1 white bishop, e1 black bishop, h1 white king

Mate in two moves
Piotr Ruszczyński
1st Prize, M. Vukcevich Mem. Ty., 2004

Position: b7 black bishop, c6 black rook, d6 black pawn, e6 black pawn, d5 black pawn, g5 white queen, h5 black pawn, b4 black bishop, e4 black pawn, g3 black pawn, b2 white rook, f2 white pawn, g2 white pawn, b1 white rook, c1 white bishop, e1 white knight, f1 black king, g1 white knight, h1 white king

Mate in three moves

Under the name Piotr, Ruszczyński is known as an author of chess problems holding the title of International Master of Chess Composition of FIDE (since 1988). 30 his problems of all genres were selected to FIDE Albums by the Permanent Commission of the FIDE for Chess Compositions.

To the left is one of early Ruszczyński's problems. The key 1. Qa6! gives the black king three flight squares and threatens 2. Qxb5#. Black's defenses are followed by seven different battery mates: 1 ... Kb4 2. Sc6#, 1 ... Kc5 2. Sxb5#, 1 ... Kd3 2. Sc2#, 1 ... Qe8 2. Se6#, 1 ... Qxf5 2. Sxf5#, 1 ... Qxe2 2. Sxe2#, 1 ... Qf3+ 2. Sxf3#.

To the right is one of Ruszczyński's best-known threemovers. The key is 1.Qf6! with the threat 2. fxg3+ Kxe1 3. Bd2#. In the two main variations, black Grimshaw interference on the square c3 is exploited with anticipatory shut-offs from a white half battery. After 1. ... Bc3 white plays 2. Nc2! (threatening 3. Bd2#), and then 2. ... Bxf6 3. Be3# (using the anticipatory shutoff on c2), 2. ... Bxb2 3. Bxb2#, and 2. ... Be1 3. Ne3#. After 1. ... Rc3 white plays 2. Bd2! (threatening 3. Nc2#), and then 2. ... Rf3 3. Nd3# (using the anticipatory shutoff on d2), 2. ... Re3 3. fxe3#, and 2. ... Rc1 3. fxg3#.

With Jan Rusinek, Ruszczyński co-authored the book: 64 Polish Chess Compositions. Warszawa: Polski Związek Szachowy. 1989.
