= Oliver Friedmann =

German computer scientist and mathematician

- Education: LMU Munich (Diploma and Doctorate)
- Occupations: CTO, Computer scientist
- Known for: Lower bounds on Parity game algorithms

Oliver Friedmann is a German computer scientist and mathematician known for his work on parity games and the simplex algorithm.

Friedmann earned his doctorate's degree from LMU Munich in 2011 under the supervision of Martin Hofmann and Martin Lange.

== Awards ==
He won the Kleene Award for showing that state-of-the-art policy iteration algorithms for parity games require exponential time in the worst case. He and his coauthors extended the proof techniques to the simplex algorithm and to policy iteration for Markov decision processes. His seminal body of work on lower bounds in convex optimization, leading to a sub-exponential lower bound for Zadeh's rule, was awarded with the Tucker Prize.
