= Revised simplex method =

Linear programming algorithm

In mathematical optimization, the revised simplex method is a variant of George Dantzig's simplex method for linear programming.

The revised simplex method is mathematically equivalent to the standard simplex method but differs in implementation. Instead of maintaining a tableau which explicitly represents the constraints adjusted to a set of basic variables, it maintains a representation of a basis of the matrix representing the constraints. The matrix-oriented approach allows for greater computational efficiency by enabling sparse matrix operations.

== Problem formulation ==
For the rest of the discussion, it is assumed that a linear programming problem has been converted into the following standard form:

$$\begin{array}{rl}
\text{minimize} & \boldsymbol{c}^{\mathrm{T}} \boldsymbol{x} \\
\text{subject to} & \boldsymbol{Ax} = \boldsymbol{b}, \boldsymbol{x} \ge \boldsymbol{0}
\end{array}$$

where A ∈ ℝ^{m×n}. Without loss of generality, it is assumed that the constraint matrix A has full row rank and that the problem is feasible, i.e., there is at least one x ≥ 0 such that Ax = b. If A is rank-deficient, either there are redundant constraints, or the problem is infeasible. Both situations can be handled by a presolve step.

== Algorithmic description ==
=== Optimality conditions ===
For linear programming, the Karush–Kuhn–Tucker conditions are both necessary and sufficient for optimality. The KKT conditions of a linear programming problem in the standard form are

$$\begin{align}
\boldsymbol{Ax} & = \boldsymbol{b}, \\
\boldsymbol{A}^{\mathrm{T}} \boldsymbol{\lambda} + \boldsymbol{s} & = \boldsymbol{c}, \\
\boldsymbol{x} & \ge \boldsymbol{0}, \\
\boldsymbol{s} & \ge \boldsymbol{0}, \\
\boldsymbol{s}^{\mathrm{T}} \boldsymbol{x} & = 0
\end{align}$$

where λ and s are the Lagrange multipliers associated with the constraints Ax = b and x ≥ 0, respectively. The last condition, which is equivalent to s_{i}x_{i} = 0 for all 1 < i < n, is called the complementary slackness condition.

By what is sometimes known as the fundamental theorem of linear programming, a vertex x of the feasible polytope can be identified by being a basis B of A chosen from the latter's columns. (Note: The same theorem also states that the feasible polytope has at least one vertex and that there is at least one vertex which is optimal.) Since A has full rank, B is nonsingular. Without loss of generality, assume that A = [B N]. Then x is given by

$$\boldsymbol{x} =
\begin{bmatrix}
\boldsymbol{x_B} \\
\boldsymbol{x_N}
\end{bmatrix} =
\begin{bmatrix}
\boldsymbol{B}^{-1} \boldsymbol{b} \\
\boldsymbol{0}
\end{bmatrix}$$

where x_{B} ≥ 0. Partition c and s accordingly into

$$\begin{align}
\boldsymbol{c} & =
\begin{bmatrix}
\boldsymbol{c_B} \\
\boldsymbol{c_N}
\end{bmatrix}, \\
\boldsymbol{s} & =
\begin{bmatrix}
\boldsymbol{s_B} \\
\boldsymbol{s_N}
\end{bmatrix}.
\end{align}$$

To satisfy the complementary slackness condition, let s_{B} = 0. It follows that

$$\begin{align}
\boldsymbol{B}^{\mathrm{T}} \boldsymbol{\lambda} & = \boldsymbol{c_B}, \\
\boldsymbol{N}^{\mathrm{T}} \boldsymbol{\lambda} + \boldsymbol{s_N} & = \boldsymbol{c_N},
\end{align}$$

which implies that

$$\begin{align}
\boldsymbol{\lambda} & = (\boldsymbol{B}^{\mathrm{T}})^{-1} \boldsymbol{c_B}, \\
\boldsymbol{s_N} & = \boldsymbol{c_N} - \boldsymbol{N}^{\mathrm{T}} \boldsymbol{\lambda}.
\end{align}$$

If s_{N} ≥ 0 at this point, the KKT conditions are satisfied, and thus x is optimal.

=== Pivot operation ===
If the KKT conditions are violated, a pivot operation consisting of introducing a column of N into the basis at the expense of an existing column in B is performed. In the absence of degeneracy, a pivot operation always results in a strict decrease in c^{T}x. Therefore, if the problem is bounded, the revised simplex method must terminate at an optimal vertex after repeated pivot operations because there are only a finite number of vertices.

Select an index m < q ≤ n such that s_{q} < 0 as the entering index. The corresponding column of A, A_{q}, will be moved into the basis, and x_{q} will be allowed to increase from zero. It can be shown that

$$\frac{\partial (\boldsymbol{c}^{\mathrm{T}} \boldsymbol{x})}{\partial x_q} = s_q,$$

i.e., every unit increase in x_{q} results in a decrease by −s_{q} in c^{T}x. Since

$$\boldsymbol{B x_B} + \boldsymbol{A}_q x_q = \boldsymbol{b},$$

x_{B} must be correspondingly decreased by Δx_{B} = B^{−1}A_{q}x_{q} subject to x_{B} − Δx_{B} ≥ 0. Let d = B^{−1}A_{q}. If d ≤ 0, no matter how much x_{q} is increased, x_{B} − Δx_{B} will stay nonnegative. Hence, c^{T}x can be arbitrarily decreased, and thus the problem is unbounded. Otherwise, select an index p = argmin_{1≤i≤m} {x_{i}/d_{i} | d_{i} > 0} as the leaving index. This choice effectively increases x_{q} from zero until x_{p} is reduced to zero while maintaining feasibility. The pivot operation concludes with replacing A_{p} with A_{q} in the basis.

== Numerical example ==
Consider a linear program where

$$\begin{align}
\boldsymbol{c} & =
\begin{bmatrix}
-2 & -3 & -4 & 0 & 0
\end{bmatrix}^{\mathrm{T}}, \\
\boldsymbol{A} & =
\begin{bmatrix}
3 & 2 & 1 & 1 & 0 \\
2 & 5 & 3 & 0 & 1
\end{bmatrix}, \\
\boldsymbol{b} & =
\begin{bmatrix}
10 \\
15
\end{bmatrix}.
\end{align}$$

Let

$$\begin{align}
\boldsymbol{B} & =
\begin{bmatrix}
\boldsymbol{A}_4 & \boldsymbol{A}_5
\end{bmatrix}, \\
\boldsymbol{N} & =
\begin{bmatrix}
\boldsymbol{A}_1 & \boldsymbol{A}_2 & \boldsymbol{A}_3
\end{bmatrix}
\end{align}$$

initially, which corresponds to a feasible vertex x = [0 0 0 10 15]^{T}. At this moment,

$$\begin{align}
\boldsymbol{\lambda} & =
\begin{bmatrix}
0 & 0
\end{bmatrix}^{\mathrm{T}}, \\
\boldsymbol{s_N} & =
\begin{bmatrix}
-2 & -3 & -4
\end{bmatrix}^{\mathrm{T}}.
\end{align}$$

Choose q = 3 as the entering index. Then d = [1 3]^{T}, which means a unit increase in x_{3} results in x_{4} and x_{5} being decreased by 1 and 3, respectively. Therefore, x_{3} is increased to 5, at which point x_{5} is reduced to zero, and p = 5 becomes the leaving index.

After the pivot operation,

$$\begin{align}
\boldsymbol{B} & =
\begin{bmatrix}
\boldsymbol{A}_3 & \boldsymbol{A}_4
\end{bmatrix}, \\
\boldsymbol{N} & =
\begin{bmatrix}
\boldsymbol{A}_1 & \boldsymbol{A}_2 & \boldsymbol{A}_5
\end{bmatrix}.
\end{align}$$

Correspondingly,

$$\begin{align}
\boldsymbol{x} & =
\begin{bmatrix}
0 & 0 & 5 & 5 & 0
\end{bmatrix}^{\mathrm{T}}, \\
\boldsymbol{\lambda} & =
\begin{bmatrix}
0 & -4/3
\end{bmatrix}^{\mathrm{T}}, \\
\boldsymbol{s_N} & =
\begin{bmatrix}
2/3 & 11/3 & 4/3
\end{bmatrix}^{\mathrm{T}}.
\end{align}$$

A positive s_{N} indicates that x is now optimal.

== Practical issues ==
=== Degeneracy ===
Because the revised simplex method is mathematically equivalent to the simplex method, it also suffers from degeneracy, where a pivot operation does not result in a decrease in c^{T}x, and a chain of pivot operations causes the basis to cycle. A perturbation or lexicographic strategy can be used to prevent cycling and guarantee termination.

=== Basis representation ===
Two types of linear systems involving B are present in the revised simplex method:

$$\begin{align}
\boldsymbol{B z} & = \boldsymbol{y}, \\
\boldsymbol{B}^{\mathrm{T}} \boldsymbol{z} & = \boldsymbol{y}.
\end{align}$$

Instead of refactorizing B, usually an LU factorization is directly updated after each pivot operation, for which purpose there exist several strategies such as the Forrest−Tomlin and Bartels−Golub methods. However, the amount of data representing the updates as well as numerical errors builds up over time and makes periodic refactorization necessary.

== Notes and references ==
=== Bibliography ===
- Morgan, S. S. (1997). A Comparison of Simplex Method Algorithms (MSc thesis). University of Florida. Archived from the original on 7 August 2011.
- Nocedal, J.; Wright, S. J. (2006). Mikosch, T. V.; Resnick, S. I.; Robinson, S. M. (eds.). Numerical Optimization. Springer Series in Operations Research and Financial Engineering (2nd ed.). New York, NY, USA: Springer. ISBN 978-0-387-30303-1.
