= Preferential bidding system =

Preferential bidding system (PBS) is a computer program for crew scheduling, a method of solving airlines workforce schedules consisting of specific flights and certain qualified crew members while allowing those crew members to request periodic work schedules using weighted preferences. The solution must be as efficient as possible while respecting crew member preferences, honoring seniority, conforming to regulations, and operation coverage requirements.

== Pairings ==
Work schedules in the airlines industry must cover not just a shift or a day, as workers in other industries might. Airlines work schedules consist of assignments called "crew pairings" or simply "pairings", which is a sequence of flights or legs that starts and then ends at the same domicile. Pairings are usually created by another computer program called pairing optimizer.

== Bidding and line ==
The process of requesting a certain schedule is called "bidding". Generally this is done on a monthly basis. The monthly schedule called "line" which a crew member gets will consist of a series of "pairings". Each month the airlines crew planning sets the new pairings due to new locations being added or removed, new times, or changes in aircraft. These new pairings are then made available for assignment or bidding. In the United States, crew members are often working under a union's collective bargaining agreement, and sometimes including non-union workplaces, seniority is used to give senior crew members the right to override junior crew members' requests. A line itself must also satisfy legal and contractual constraints. Ideally it should also satisfy the crew members choices and preferences.

== Constraints ==
Each month, airlines crew planning must generate legal crewing solutions. These crewing solutions strive to achieve a minimum cost of operation by matching specific aircraft, the routes they fly and crew pairings in a manner that each leg is covered by one crew that is capable of flying that aircraft at that time and in that place. The factors that must be respected when assigning a crew member line are called "constraints" which include:

- Government Regulations - FAR 117, FAR 121, FAR 135, CAP 371, CASA, DGAC etc. dependent upon the type of operation and the civil authority overseeing that particular airline.
- Collective Bargaining Agreements (CBA) - ALPA, AFA, IBT
- Airline Policies - FRMP, Fairness

These include:

- Flight Time Limitations (FTL) - Daily, Weekly, Monthly, Quarterly and Yearly
- Flight Duty Period Limitations (FDP) - Daily, Weekly, Monthly
- Duty Period Limitations - Daily, Weekly, Monthly
- Rest and Day(s) off Requirements - Daily, Weekly, Monthly
- Acclimatization - mitigation for travel across several time zones
- Diurnal components - Time of day and impingement upon the Window of Circadian Low (WOCL)
- Augmentation (operations with additional active crew members)
- Credit/Pay Limitations
- Pre-assigned absences and duties.
- Scheduling Continuity - time between flights, Overlapping activities, Separation of assignments, base allocation of crew members, Reserve limitations, Crew Training Requirements.

== Crew scheduling methods ==
There are three general approaches to solving this complex crewing challenge: Assigned Lines, Bid lines and PBS.

=== Assigned Lines ===
In the Assigned Lines approach, the properties of the line, and days off are simply managed via the use of constraints to build "legal" lines. The optimizer finds the most efficient use of the pairings and reserve assignments. A crew member will have no bidding or preferences.

=== Bid lines ===
In the bid lines approach, pairings are placed within pre-built lines by line optimizer, a computer program that puts the pairings into "legal" lines, and does not take into account the individual crew members' preferences, nor the constraints imposed by crew members. The generic set of lines are then published for bidding. A crew member is free to choose any line and it will be awarded as long as no other senior crew member also wants this same line. Unless they are the most senior in the bid package, a crew member needs to submit multiple preferred lines in order to guarantee a preferred line; otherwise, a leftover line will be awarded. By the bidding process, the preferred line may not be awarded completely, because the line was created without reference to specific crew member constraints, it may conflict with crew members' predetermined activities. The conflicting pairings must then be reassigned to other crew members resulting in a wide range of inefficiencies. Clearly this post-award reallocation is costly to the airlines. These inefficiencies also force airlines to hire more crew members. However, bid line does offer a transparent and easy process to bid and to award, and in many cases the conflict itself actually benefits the crew members that being paid without the work according to the contracts. Though management is eager to streamline operations, crew members may still prefer the bid lines.

=== PBS ===
In this approach, the lines have not been created at the bidding, and the crew members have the ability to designate what kind of pairings, the properties of the line, and days off they prefer, thereby building a line themselves. PBS also allows crew members to bid reserve duties mixed with the pairings biddings. PBS provides a one-step process from the pairings to the lines that each crew member prefers and can legally cover.

The challenge for PBS is that it tries to solve two conflicting goals, honoring preferences without violating seniority and awarding all pairings.

==== Conventional PBS ====
In a conventional PBS, crew members make their bids and choose their preferences based upon their own best interests. Once all the bids are made and the bid period ends, the program attempts to create the solution by an "optimization" process. Each crew member will be awarded the best line of his own definitions from available pairings at his seniority. For each crew member, when there are many best lines, the one with the least interest conflict to the junior crew members will be awarded, which is an advantage that interactive PBS cannot achieve. The optimization system finds a way to satisfy both senior and junior crew members while still honoring seniority and operation coverage requirement. The optimization process itself is complicated and may take many hours and multiple runs to achieve the optimal solution. A preference is rejected due to a pairing being awarded to someone senior, overall coverage issues, or legality violations. The reason for rejection will be provided.

==== Interactive PBS ====
Computerized Bidding was first First introduced in 1986 by SBS. The application was developed by SBS founder Christian Boegner who later founded Crewing Solutions, and was in use on powerful internal computers at TWA among other airlines. By 1992 using such services as CompuServe and the newly introduced home PCs, SBS allowed Pilots to Bid using the internet to connect to the SBS bidding and scheduling programs running within the airlines networks.

With the advent of increasingly more powerful airline and home computers as well as high speed internet connectivity having become ubiquitous and mainstream, those original computerized programs have evolved into today's web-based applications, with crew members using laptop computers or even mobile devices to bid. The conventional PBS process can now be fully interactive, affording the possibility that more crew members get a schedule that fulfills their wishes. In this scheme, bidding can be a continuous process lasting several days or weeks, and can offer interactivity, where crew members can see the status of other crew member bids reflected as they bid. A crew member can change preferences in the midst of the process after seeing how others are bidding.

Without a live, interactive PBS's interactive recalculation during the bid period, if crew members bid for certain pairings and/or days off heavily over others, at the end of the bid period either a secondary, time-consuming algorithm needs to be implemented to solve the resultant conflicts, or manual manipulation is used to fill the "open time" (unassigned pairings).

== Implement PBS ==
PBS is not a new concept and the products have been available in the market and used in many airlines for many years. The algorithms used may be very different and usually lead to very different results and satisfactions. In addition, the user interfaces that provided for crew members to enter the preferences are also very different from vendor to vendor. The evaluation of the PBS products and the negotiation between the management and crew members are the most important and critical steps of a successful implementation of the PBS.
