= George Dantzig =

American mathematician (1914–2005)

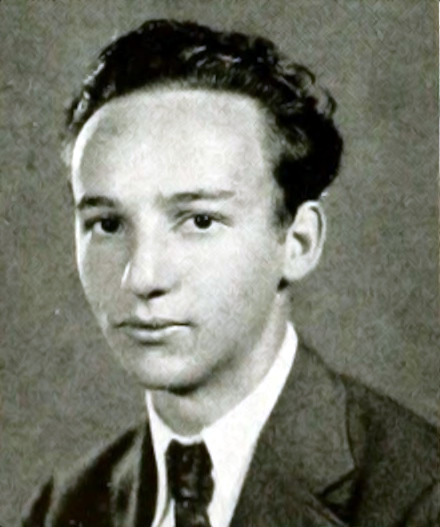
- Dantzig c. 1936
- Born: George Bernard Dantzig; November 8, 1914; Portland, Oregon, US
- Died: May 13, 2005 (aged 90); Stanford, California, US
- Education: University of Maryland (BS); University of Michigan (MS); University of California, Berkeley (PhD)
- Known for: Linear programming Quadratic programming Stochastic programming Linear complementarity problem Max-flow min-cut theorem of networks Pseudoforest; Vehicle routing problem Dantzig's simplex algorithm Dantzig–Wolfe decomposition
- Awards: John von Neumann Theory Prize (1975) National Medal of Science (1975); Harvey Prize (1985); Harold Pender Award (1995)
- Scientific career
- Fields: Mathematics; Operations research Industrial engineering Computer science Economics; Statistics
- Workplaces: U.S. Air Force Office of Statistical Control; RAND Corporation; University of California, Berkeley; Stanford University
- Doctoral advisor: Jerzy Neyman
- Doctoral students: Ilan Adler; Robert Fourer; Alfredo Noel Iusem; Ellis L. Johnson; Thomas Magnanti; Roger J-B Wets; Yinyu Ye

George Bernard Dantzig (/ˈdæntsɪɡ/; November 8, 1914 – May 13, 2005) was an American mathematical scientist who made contributions to industrial engineering, operations research, computer science, economics, and statistics.

Dantzig is known for his development of the simplex algorithm, an algorithm for solving linear programming problems, and for his other work with linear programming. In statistics, Dantzig solved two open problems in statistical theory, which he had mistaken for homework after arriving late to a lecture by Polish mathematician-statistician Jerzy Neyman.

At his death, Dantzig was professor emeritus of transportation sciences and professor of operations research and of computer science at Stanford University.

== Early life ==
Born to Jewish parents in Portland, Oregon, George Bernard Dantzig was named after George Bernard Shaw, the Irish writer. His father, Tobias Dantzig, was a mathematician and linguist, and his mother, Anja Dantzig (née Ourisson), was a Russian-born linguist of French-Lithuanian origin. Dantzig's parents met during their study at the University of Paris, where Tobias studied mathematics under Henri Poincaré, after whom Dantzig's brother was named. The Dantzigs emigrated to the United States, where they settled in Portland, Oregon.

Early in the 1920s the Dantzig family moved from Baltimore to Washington, D.C. His mother became a linguist at the Library of Congress, and his father became a math tutor at the University of Maryland, College Park.

== Education ==
Dantzig attended Powell Junior High School and Central High School. By the time he reached high school, he was already fascinated by geometry, and this interest was further nurtured by his father, challenging him with complicated problems, particularly in projective geometry.

George Dantzig received his B.S. from University of Maryland in 1936 in mathematics and physics. He earned his master's degree in mathematics from the University of Michigan in 1937. After working as a junior statistician at the Bureau of Labor Statistics from 1937 to 1939, he enrolled in the doctoral program in mathematics at the University of California, Berkeley, where he studied statistics under Jerzy Neyman.

During his study in 1939, Dantzig solved two unsolved problems in statistics due to a misunderstanding. Near the beginning of a class, Professor Neyman wrote two problems on the blackboard. Dantzig arrived late and assumed that they were a homework assignment. According to Dantzig, they "seemed to be a little harder than usual", but a few days later he handed in completed solutions for both problems, still believing that they were an assignment that was overdue. Six weeks later, an excited Neyman happily told him that the problems he had solved were two of the most famous unsolved problems in statistics. He had prepared one of Dantzig's solutions for publication in a mathematical journal. This story spread and was used as a motivational lesson demonstrating the power of positive thinking. Over time, some facts were altered, but the basic story persisted in the form of an urban legend and as an introductory scene in the 1997 film Good Will Hunting.

Dantzig recalled in a 1986 interview in the College Mathematics Journal, "A year later, when I began to worry about a thesis topic, Neyman just shrugged and told me to wrap the two problems in a binder and he would accept them as my thesis."

Years later, another researcher, Abraham Wald, was preparing to publish a paper in which he had arrived at a conclusion for the second problem when he learned of Dantzig's earlier solution. When Dantzig suggested publishing jointly, Wald simply added Dantzig's name as co-author.

== Career ==
With the outbreak of World War II, Dantzig took a leave of absence from the doctoral program at Berkeley to work as a civilian for the United States Army Air Forces. From 1941 to 1946, he became the head of the combat analysis branch of the Headquarters Statistical Control for the Army Air Forces. In 1946, he returned to Berkeley to complete the requirements of his program and received his PhD that year. Although he had a faculty offer from Berkeley, he returned to the Air Force as mathematical advisor to the comptroller.

In 1952, Dantzig joined the mathematics division of the RAND Corporation. By 1960, he became a professor in the Department of Industrial Engineering at UC Berkeley, where he founded and directed the Operations Research Center. In 1966, he joined the Stanford faculty as Professor of Operations Research and of Computer Science. A year later, the Program in Operations Research became a full-fledged department. In 1973, he founded the Systems Optimization Laboratory (SOL) there. On a sabbatical leave that year, he managed the Methodology Group at the International Institute for Applied Systems Analysis (IIASA) in Laxenburg, Austria. Later, he became the C. A. Criley Professor of Transportation Sciences at Stanford University.

He was a member of the National Academy of Sciences, the National Academy of Engineering, and the American Academy of Arts and Sciences. Dantzig was the recipient of many honors, including the first John von Neumann Theory Prize in 1974, the National Medal of Science in 1975, and an honorary doctorate from the University of Maryland, College Park in 1976. The Mathematical Programming Society honored Dantzig by creating the George B. Dantzig Prize, bestowed every three years since 1982 on one or two people who have made a significant impact in the field of mathematical programming. He was elected to the 2002 class of Fellows of the Institute for Operations Research and the Management Sciences.

=== Research ===
Freund wrote further that "through his research in mathematical theory, computation, economic analysis, and applications to industrial problems, Dantzig contributed more than any other researcher to the remarkable development of linear programming".

Dantzig's work allows the airline industry, for example, to schedule crews and make fleet assignments. Based on his work, tools are developed "that shipping companies use to determine how many planes they need and where their delivery trucks should be deployed. The oil industry long has used linear programming in refinery planning, as it determines how much of its raw product should become different grades of gasoline and how much should be used for petroleum-based byproducts. It is used in manufacturing, revenue management, telecommunications, advertising, architecture, circuit design and countless other areas".

==== Linear programming ====
Linear programming is a mathematical method for determining a way to achieve the best outcome (such as maximum profit or lowest cost) in a given mathematical model for some list of requirements represented as linear relationships. Linear programming arose as a mathematical model developed during World War II to plan expenditures and returns in order to reduce costs to the army and increase losses to the enemy. It was kept secret until 1947. Postwar, many industries found its use in their daily planning.

The founders of this subject are Leonid Kantorovich, a Russian mathematician who developed linear programming problems in 1939, Dantzig, who published the simplex method in 1947, and John von Neumann, who developed the theory of the duality in the same year.

Dantzig was asked to work out a method the Air Force could use to improve their planning process. This led to his original example of finding the best assignment of 70 people to 70 jobs, showing the usefulness of linear programming. The computing power required to test all the permutations to select the best assignment is vast; the number of possible configurations exceeds the number of particles in the universe. However, it takes only a moment to find the optimum solution by posing the problem as a linear program and applying the Simplex algorithm. The theory behind linear programming drastically reduces the number of possible optimal solutions that must be checked, and today industrial linear programs with tens or hundreds of thousands or even more variables are routinely solved.

In 1963, Dantzig's Linear Programming and Extensions was published by Princeton University Press. It quickly became a standard text in linear programming.

== Personal life ==
Dantzig married Anne S. Shmuner in 1936. He died on May 13, 2005, in his home in Stanford, California, of complications from diabetes and cardiovascular disease. He was 90 years old. He had three children: David, Paul, and Jessica.

== Presidential award ==
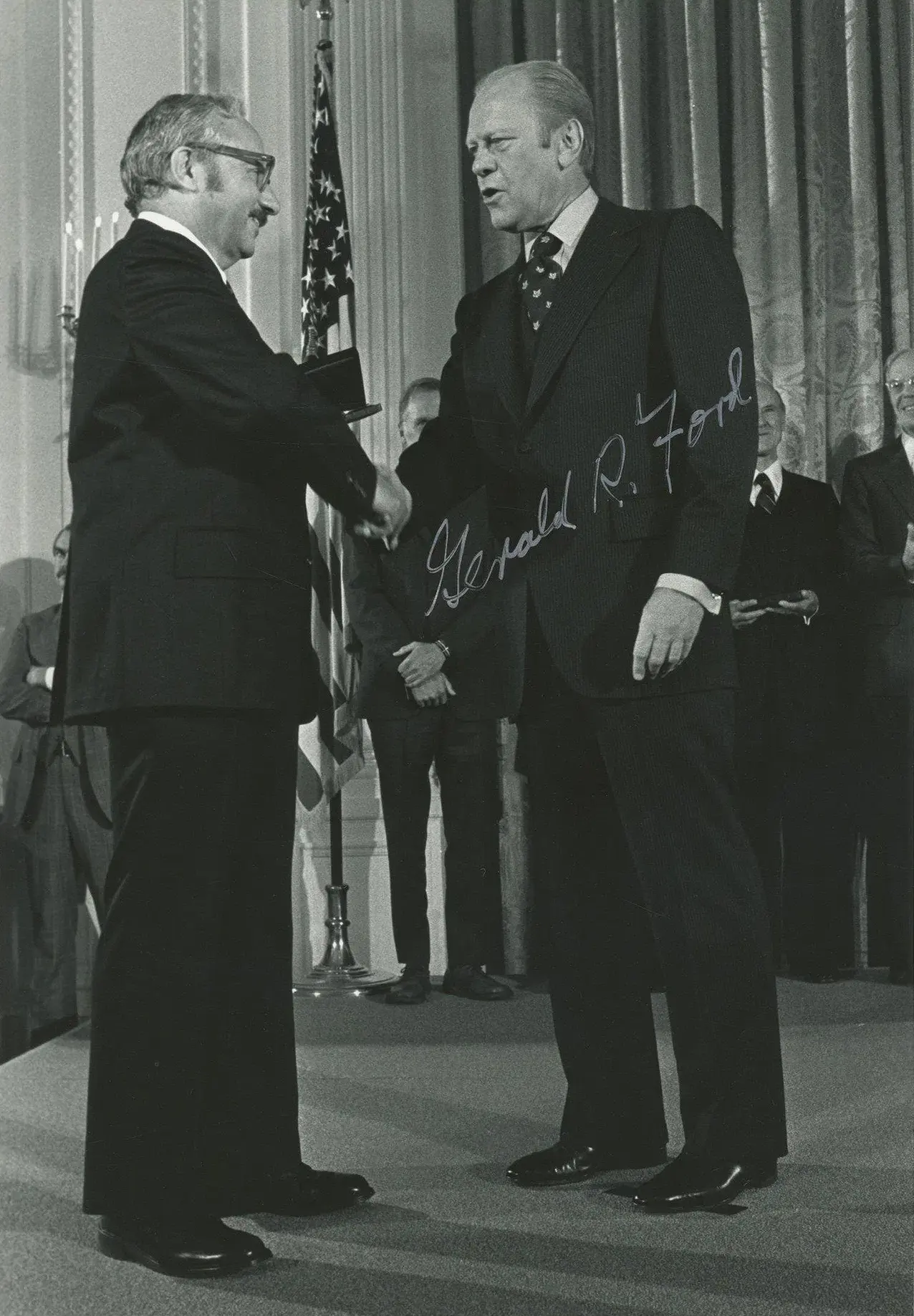
Dantzig with Ford at the 1976 National Medal of Science Awards Ceremony

On October 18, 1976, President Gerald Ford presented Dantzig with the National Medal of Science. The award was given "For inventing linear programming and discovering methods that led to wide-scale scientific and technical applications to important problems in logistics, scheduling, and network optimization, and to the use of computers in making efficient use of the mathematical theory."

== Publications ==
Books by George Dantzig:

- 1953. Notes on linear programming. RAND Corporation.
- 1956. Linear inequalities and related systems. With others. Edited by H.W. Kuhn and A.W. Tucker. Princeton University Press.
- 1963. Linear programming and extensions. Princeton University Press and the RAND Corporation. pdf from RAND
- 1966. On the continuity of the minimum set of a continuous function. With Jon H. Folkman and Norman Shapiro.
- 1968. Mathematics of the decision sciences. With Arthur F. Veinott, Jr. Summer Seminar on Applied Mathematics 5th : 1967 : Stanford University. American Mathematical Society.
- 1969. Lectures in differential equations. A. K. Aziz, general editor. Contributors: George B. Dantzig and others.
- 1970. Natural gas transmission system optimization. With others.
- 1973. Compact city; a plan for a liveable urban environment. With Thomas L. Saaty.
- 1974. Studies in optimization. Edited with B.C. Eaves. Mathematical Association of America.
- 1985. Mathematical programming : essays in honor of George B. Dantzig. Edited by R.W. Cottle. Mathematical Programming Society.
- 1997. Linear programming 1: Introduction. G.B.D. and Mukund N. Thapa. Springer-Verlag.
- 2003. Linear programming 2: Theory and Extensions. G.B.D. and Mukund N. Thapa. Springer-Verlag.
- 2003. The Basic George B. Dantzig. Edited by Richard W. Cottle. Stanford Business Books, Stanford University Press, Stanford, California.

Book chapters:

- Dantzig, George B. (1960), "General convex objective forms", in Arrow, Kenneth J.; Karlin, Samuel; Suppes, Patrick (eds.), Mathematical models in the social sciences, 1959: Proceedings of the first Stanford symposium, Stanford mathematical studies in the social sciences, IV, Stanford, California: Stanford University Press, pp. 151–158. ISBN 9780804700214.

Articles, a selection:

- Dantzig, George B. (June 1940). "On the Non-Existence of Tests of 'Student's' Hypothesis Having Power Functions Independent of σ". The Annals of Mathematical Statistics. 11 (2): 186–92. doi:10.1214/aoms/1177731912. JSTOR 2235875.
- Wood, Marshall K.; Dantzig, George B. (1949). "Programming of Interdependent Activities: I General Discussion". Econometrica. 17 (3/4): 193–9. doi:10.2307/1905522. JSTOR 1905522.
- Dantzig, George B. (1949). "Programming of Interdependent Activities: II Mathematical Model". Econometrica. 17 (3): 200–211. doi:10.2307/1905523. JSTOR 1905523.
- Dantzig, George B. (1955). "Optimal Solution of a Dynamic Leontief Model with Substitution". Econometrica. 23 (3): 295–302. doi:10.2307/1910385. JSTOR 1910385.

== See also ==
- Dantzig–Wolfe decomposition
- Knapsack problem
- Maximum flow problem
- Optimization (mathematics)
- Travelling salesman problem
- Shadow price
