= Devex algorithm =

In applied mathematics, the devex algorithm is a pivot rule for the simplex method developed by Paula M. J. Harris. It identifies the steepest-edge approximately in its search for the optimal solution.
