= Werner Römisch =

German mathematician

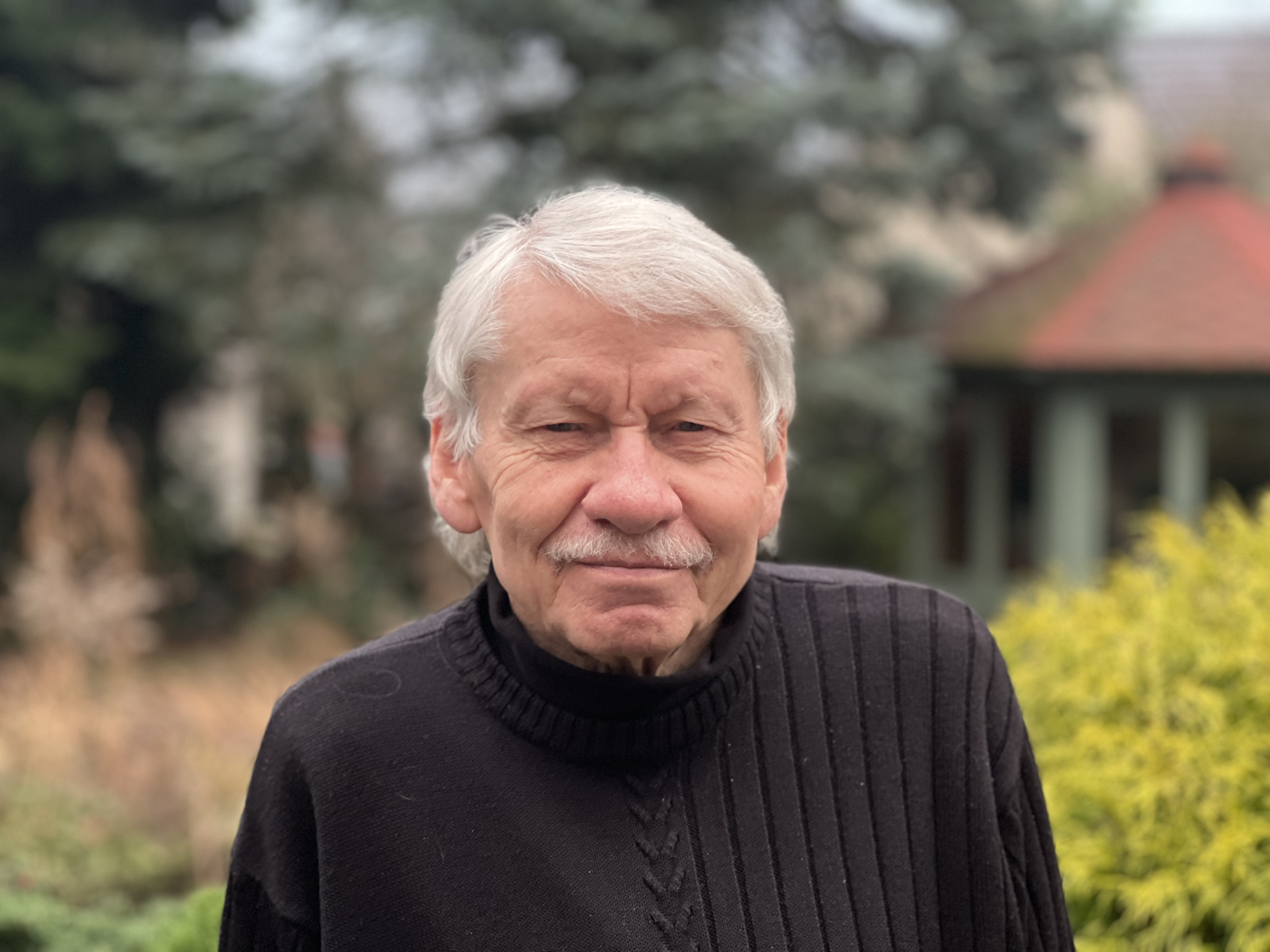
- Born: Werner Römisch; 28 December 1947; Zwickau, Germany
- Education: Humboldt University of Berlin
- Known for: Stochastic Programming; Optimization in energy industry
- Awards: Khachiyan Prize 2018
- Scientific career
- Fields: Numerical analysis; Optimization; Stochastic Programming
- Workplaces: Humboldt University of Berlin
- Website: www.mathematik.hu-berlin.de/~romisch/

Werner Römisch (28 December 1947 – 7 June 2024) is a German mathematician, professor emeritus at the Humboldt University of Berlin, most known for his pioneer work in the field of stochastic programming.

== Education and early life ==
Römisch was born in Zwickau, Germany in 1947. He earned his diploma degree in Mathematics (1971) and doctoral degree in mathematics (1976) at the Humboldt University of Berlin (HUB). In 1984 he earned his Habilitation degree and after that he was appointed as Privatdozent at the HUB. In 1993 he became full professor of applied mathematics at HUB. He is married to Ute Römisch, lives in Berlin and has two children.

== Career and research ==
Römisch is known for being a pioneer in the field of stochastic programming, to which he made several significant contributions. His work on analysis of discrete approximations, stability, power systems, risk quantification and management, scenario reduction and efficient Monte-Carlo sampling are notable contributions to the field. He authored three books and more than 130 research papers. He was co-editor of the Journal of Stochastic Programming E-Print Series (1999–2018), Associate Editor of Optimization Letters (OPTL) (2006–2013), of Energy Systems (2009–2020), of Computational Management Science (2012–2020), and of SIAM Journal on Optimization (2013– ). He is co-author of the algorithm for scenario reduction SCENRED, which is used in several optimization frameworks in the energy industry.

=== Awards and honours ===
2018 Khachiyan Prize Winner for lifetime achievements in the field of optimization awarded by the INFORMS Optimization Society.
