= Porous set =

Mathematical concept for metric spaces

In mathematics, a porous set is a concept in the study of metric spaces. Like the concepts of meagre and measure zero sets, a porous set can be considered "sparse" or "lacking bulk"; however, porous sets are not equivalent to either meagre sets or measure zero sets, as shown below.

== Definition ==
Let (X, d) be a complete metric space and let E be a subset of X. Let B(x, r) denote the closed ball in (X, d) with centre x ∈ X and radius r > 0. E is said to be porous if there exist constants 0 < α < 1 and r_{0} > 0 such that, for every 0 < r ≤ r_{0} and every x ∈ X, there is some point y ∈ X with

$$B(y, \alpha r) \subseteq B(x, r) \setminus E.$$

A subset of X is called σ-porous if it is a countable union of porous subsets of X.

== Properties ==
- Any porous set is nowhere dense. Hence, all σ-porous sets are meagre sets (or of the first category).
- If X is a finite-dimensional Euclidean space R^{n}, then porous subsets are sets of Lebesgue measure zero.
- However, there does exist a non-σ-porous subset P of R^{n} which is of the first category and of Lebesgue measure zero. This is known as Zajíček's theorem.
- The relationship between porosity and being nowhere dense can be illustrated as follows: if E is nowhere dense, then for x ∈ X and r > 0, there is a point y ∈ X and s > 0 such that

$$B(y, s) \subseteq B(x, r) \setminus E.$$

However, if E is also porous, then it is possible to take s = αr (at least for small enough r), where 0 < α < 1 is a constant that depends only on E.
