= Ralph E. Gomory =

American mathematician (born 1929)

Ralph Gomory
- Born: May 7, 1929 (age 97); Brooklyn Heights, New York, US
- Education: Williams College (B.A., 1950); Princeton University (Ph.D., 1954)
- Known for: Gomory's cut
- Awards: Frederick W. Lanchester Prize (1963); IRI Medal (1985); National Medal of Science (1988); IEEE Ernst Weber Engineering Leadership Recognition (1988); Heinz Award, Technology, the Economy and Employment (1998); Vannevar Bush Award (2021)
- Scientific career
- Fields: Mathematics
- Workplaces: Thomas J. Watson Research Center
- Thesis: Critical Points at Infinity and Forced Oscillation (1954)
- Doctoral advisor: Solomon Lefschetz

Ralph Edward Gomory (born May 7, 1929) is an American applied mathematician and executive. Gomory worked at IBM as a researcher and later as an executive. During that time, his research led to the creation of new areas of applied mathematics. He made foundational contributions to integer programming, including the development in 1958 of a general cutting-plane method for solving integer linear programs.

After his career in the corporate world, Gomory became the president of the Alfred P. Sloan Foundation, where he oversaw programs dedicated to broadening public understanding in three key areas: the economic importance of science and research; the effects of globalization on the United States; and the role of technology in education.

Gomory has written extensively on the nature of technology development, industrial competitiveness, models of international trade, social issues under current economics and law, and the function of the corporation in a globalizing world.

== Biography ==
Gomory is the son of Andrew L. Gomory and Marian Schellenberg. He graduated from George School in Newtown, PA in 1946. He received his B.A. from Williams College in 1950, studied at Cambridge University, and received his Ph.D. in mathematics from Princeton University in 1954.

He served in the U.S. Navy from 1954 to 1957. While serving in the Navy, he shifted his focus to applied mathematics in operations research. Among his mathematical achievements were founding contributions to the field of integer programming, an active area of research to this day. He was Higgins lecturer and assistant professor at Princeton University, 1957-59. He joined the Research Division of IBM in 1959. In 1964 he was appointed IBM Fellow. In 1970, Gomory became Director of Research with line responsibility for IBM's Research Division. During his tenure IBM researchers made major contributions to the understanding of memory devices (Dennard scaling), made major advances possible in high-density storage devices and produced advanced silicon processing methods. They also invented the relational database (Codd) and the RISC computer architecture. His researchers also won two successive Nobel Prizes in Physics and it was at IBM Research that Benoit Mandelbrot created the now widely accepted concept of fractals. He continued in a leadership role for the next 20 years eventually becoming IBM Senior Vice President for Science and Technology. In 1979, the book Science and Technology, A Five Year Outlook was published, collaborated with the National Academy of Sciences by W.H. Freeman and Company, with Gomory took the role of Study Chairman.

In 1975, Gomory was elected a member of the National Academy of Engineering for contributions to the fields of linear and integer programming, and leadership in the development of computer technology.

After reaching the mandatory retirement age of 60 for corporate officers at IBM, Gomory became president of the Alfred P. Sloan Foundation in 1989.

During his tenure as president he led the foundation’s effort to sponsor research in numerous fields relevant to major national issues. The foundation’ work in the field of online learning predated the public Internet; its continued support has resulted in nearly seven million people taking online courses for credit as of 2012. The foundation started the now-widespread program of industry studies, and launched a program advocating a more flexible workplace. It developed an approach to overcoming the problem of underrepresented minority Ph.D.’s in scientific and technical fields. Among scientific achievements, the foundation supported the widely recognized Sloan Digital Sky Survey, which has made major contributions to the problem of dark energy, and initiated a worldwide effort to survey life in the oceans known as the Census of Marine Life. Under Gomory's leadership the Alfred P. Sloan Foundation also supported programs on public understanding of science and the development of the Professional Science Masters, designed to allow students to pursue advanced training in science or mathematics while simultaneously developing workplace skills.

In December 2007, after 18 years as president of the Sloan Foundation, Gomory became president emeritus and joined the Stern School of Business at New York University as a research professor. Currently he focuses his work on addressing the increasing complexities of the globalized economy and the differing goals of countries and companies. His 2001 book, co-written with Professor William Baumol, Global Trade and Conflicting National Interests, focuses on the roles and responsibilities of American corporations in the modern American economy.

He served on the U.S. President’s Council of Advisors on Science and Technology (PCAST) from 1984 to 1992, and again from 2001 to 2009, advising three Presidents that included Ronald Reagan, George H.W. Bush, and George W. Bush.

He has also served as director of The Washington Post Company and The Bank of New York, and he currently serves on the board of the National Academies Board on Science, Technology and Economic Policy.

Gomory currently blogs at The Huffington Post and his work has been profiled in The Nation and The Wall Street Journal.

== Awards and honors ==
Gomory has been awarded eight honorary degrees and many significant awards including the National Medal of Science.

Awards: Lanchester Prize of the Operations Research Society, 1963; Harry Goode Memorial Award of the American Federation of Information Processing Societies, 1984; John von Neumann Theory Prize of INFORMS, 1984; IRI Medal of the Industrial Research Institute, 1985; National Medal of Science, 1988; IEEE Engineering Leadership Recognition Award, 1988; Arthur M. Bueche Award of the National Academy of Engineering, 1993; the 4th Annual Heinz Award for Technology, the Economy and Employment, 1998; Madison Medal of Princeton University, 1999; Sheffield Fellowship Award of the Yale University Faculty of Engineering, 2000; International Federation of Operational Research Societies’ Hall of Fame, 2005; Harold Larnder Prize of the Canadian Operational Research Society, 2006. 2002 class of Fellows of the Institute for Operations Research and the Management Sciences.

Gomory has been elected to many honorific societies including the National Academy of Science, the National Academy of Engineering, and the American Philosophical Society. He was also elected to the governing councils of all three of these societies. Additionally three awards have been established in Gomory’s honor. The National Academy of Science’s Award for the industrial application of science, established by IBM, the Ralph Gomory Prize of the Business History Conference, established by the Sloan Foundation, and the Ralph E. Gomory Award for quality online education presented annually by the On-Line Consortium.

== Publication ==
In addition to the book Global Trade and Conflicting National Interests, Gomory has published more than 80 articles on a great variety of subjects including mathematics, economics, the management and impact of science and technology, and the role and function of corporations. His articles were published in various platforms and sites, including American Philosophical Society, Scientific American, Harvard Business Review, etc.

== See also ==
- Linear program
  - Gomory's cutting-plane method
- William J. Baumol
- List of members of the National Academy of Sciences
- List of National Medal of Science recipients
- National Academy of Engineering
- American Philosophical Society

== Sources ==
All text has been merged to form a single piece of text and they are from these cited sources:

- The Heinz Awards, Ralph E. Gomory profile
- National Academies Press - RALPH E. GOMORY
- National Academy of Science - Ralph E. Gomory, Ph.D.
- IBM builders
- Sloan Foundation web site
