= Alexander Shapiro =

Industrial engineer at Georgia Institute of Technology

Alexander Shapiro is an A. Russell Chandler III Chair and Professor in H. Milton Stewart School of Industrial and Systems Engineering at Georgia Tech. He was editor-in-chief of the journal Mathematical Programming, Series A and was an area editor of the journal Operations Research. Shapiro graduated with M.Sc. degree in mathematics from Moscow State University in 1971 and ten years later got his Ph.D. in applied mathematics and statistics from Ben-Gurion University of the Negev.
