= Manfred W. Padberg =

German mathematician (1941–2014)

Manfred Wilhelm Padberg
- Born: 10 October 1941; Bottrop, Germany
- Died: 12 May 2014 (aged 72)
- Education: Carnegie Mellon University
- Awards: John von Neumann Theory Prize
- Scientific career
- Workplaces: New York University
- Thesis: Essays in Integer Programming (1971)
- Doctoral advisor: Egon Balas

Manfred Wilhelm Padberg (10 October 1941 in Bottrop, Germany – 12 May 2014) was a German mathematician who worked on linear and combinatorial optimization. He and Ellis L. Johnson won the John von Neumann Theory Prize in 2000.

== Biography ==
Padberg grew up in Zagreb, Croatia, and Westphalia. From 1961 he studied mathematics at the University of Münster, where he graduated in 1967. In 1967, he was a research assistant at the University of Mannheim. Starting in September 1968, he studied at Carnegie Mellon University, where he obtained a master's degree and his Ph.D. (1971) in Industrial Administration. His advisor was Egon Balas and his dissertation was titled Essays in Integer Programming.

Afterwards he worked from 1971 to 1974 at the Berlin Science Center. From 1974, he was Associate Professor and, from 1978, Professor of Operations Research at New York University. He became a professor emeritus in 2002. He moved to Paris in 2002.

== Recognition ==
He, Martin Shubik, Ellis L. Johnson, and Harlan Crowder won the Frederick W. Lanchester Prize in 1983. He was elected to the 2002 class of Fellows of the Institute for Operations Research and the Management Sciences.

== Personal life ==
He died in 2014 from cancer.

== Works ==
- M. Padberg, Linear Optimization and Extensions, Springer-Verlag, 1999.
