= Jim Dai =

Operations researcher and applied probabilist

- Born: Jiangang Dai
- Education: Nanjing University (BS, MS); Stanford University (PhD)
- Known for: Fluid and diffusion analysis of stochastic processing networks
- Awards: John von Neumann Theory Prize (2024); ACM SIGMETRICS Achievement Award (2018)
- Scientific career
- Fields: Operations research, applied probability, queueing theory
- Workplaces: Cornell University; Georgia Institute of Technology; Chinese University of Hong Kong, Shenzhen

Jiangang "Jim" Dai (Chinese: 戴建岗) is an operations researcher and applied probabilist known for work on stochastic processing networks, queueing theory, and fluid and diffusion approximations. He is the Leon C. Welch Professor of Engineering in the School of Operations Research and Information Engineering at Cornell University. Dai received the 2024 John von Neumann Theory Prize for contributions to stochastic systems theory and the 2018 ACM SIGMETRICS Achievement Award for his analysis of queueing networks.

== Education and career ==
Dai earned bachelor's and master's degrees in mathematics from Nanjing University and a doctorate in mathematics from Stanford University in 1990. He joined the faculty of the Georgia Institute of Technology in 1990 and remained there until moving to Cornell in 2012. At Georgia Tech, he held the Chandler Family Chair in Industrial and Systems Engineering. At Cornell he became the Leon C. Welch Professor of Engineering.

Dai has also held appointments at Tsinghua University, the National University of Singapore, Aarhus University, Stanford, and the University of Wisconsin–Madison. At the Chinese University of Hong Kong, Shenzhen, he has served as dean and later honorary dean of the School of Data Science. He was editor-in-chief of the journal Mathematics of Operations Research from 2013 to 2018.

== Research ==
Dai's research concerns mathematical models for allocating resources in processing networks, including communication and computer systems, manufacturing systems, data centers, call centers, hospitals, and transportation services. His work develops fluid and diffusion approximations for analyzing the stability and control of such networks.

In a 1995 paper, "On Positive Harris Recurrence of Multiclass Queueing Networks: A Unified Approach via Fluid Limit Models", Dai established a general connection between the stability of deterministic fluid models and positive recurrence of stochastic processing-network models. INFORMS described the result as a foundation for later work on stochastic-network stability. His later research has addressed heavy-traffic diffusion approximations, reflected Brownian motion, max-weight scheduling, and quantitative approximation bounds based on Stein's method.

With J. Michael Harrison, Dai wrote the monograph Processing Networks: Fluid Models and Stability, published by Cambridge University Press in 2020.

== Awards and honors ==
INFORMS awarded Dai the 2024 John von Neumann Theory Prize for "fundamental and sustained contributions" to stochastic systems theory, particularly stochastic-network stability and heavy-traffic diffusion approximations. The prize recognizes a body of fundamental, sustained theoretical work in operations research and the management sciences.

The ACM SIGMETRICS Achievement Award recognized Dai's contributions to fluid and diffusion analysis of queueing networks and their applications to computer, communication, and processing systems. He is an elected fellow of the Institute of Mathematical Statistics and of INFORMS. His earlier honors include the 1998 Erlang Prize and the 1997 and 2017 Best Publication Awards from the INFORMS Applied Probability Society.
