= Adrian Lewis (disambiguation) =

Adrian Lewis (born 1985) is an English darts player.

Adrian Lewis may also refer to:

- Adrian Lewis (mathematician) (born 1962), British-Canadian mathematician
- Adrian Lewis Morgan (born 1973), Welsh actor
- Adrian Richard Lewis, American military historian
- Ady Lewis (born 1975), British former professional boxer

== See also ==
- Adrian
- Lewis (surname)
