= Jean O'Brien =

American historian

Jean Maria O'Brien (born February 2, 1958) is an American historian of White Earth Band of Ojibwe ancestry who specializes in northeastern Woodlands American Indian history.

== Life ==
She received her Ph.D. from the University of Chicago, where she studied with the anthropologist Raymond D. Fogelson.

She teaches History and American Indian Studies at the University of Minnesota. She has been a McKnight Distinguished University Professor since 2015.

== Private life ==
O'Brien is married to the economist Timothy J. Kehoe.

== Bibliography ==
- Kan, Sergei A., and Pauline Turner Strong, eds. (2006) New Perspectives on Native North America: Cultures, Histories, and Representations. Lincoln: University of Nebraska Press.
- O'Brien, Jean M. (1997) Dispossession by Degrees: Indian Land and Identity in Natick, Massachusetts, 1650-1790.
- O'Brien, Jean M. (2010) Firsting and Lasting: Writing Indians out of Existence in New England. University of Minnesota Press.
- O'Brien, Jean M. et al. (2015) Why You Can't Teach United States History without American Indians
