= Claudia Neuhauser =

American mathematician

Claudia Maria Neuhauser
- Born: 1962 (age 62–63)
- Education: Heidelberg University; Cornell University
- Scientific career
- Fields: mathematical biology
- Institutions: University of Southern California; University of Wisconsin–Madison; University of California, Davis; University of Minnesota Twin Cities; University of Houston
- Doctoral advisor: Rick Durrett

Claudia Maria Neuhauser (born 1962) is a mathematician whose research focuses on mathematical biology and spatial ecology. She also investigates computational biology and bioinformatics. Neuhauser is currently Vice President/Vice Chancellor for Research at the University of Houston, where she has been employed since 2018.

== Education and career ==
Neuhauser studied mathematics and physics at Heidelberg University, graduating in 1988, and earned a Ph.D. in mathematics from Cornell University in 1990 with a dissertation on ergodic theory supervised by Rick Durrett.

A professor of mathematics at the University of Minnesota-Twin Cities in 1996, and moved to the Rochester campus of the University of Minnesota in 2008 and returned to the Twin Cities campus in 2013.

At various times she has held teaching positions at the University of Southern California, University of Wisconsin–Madison, and University of California, Davis.

Before moving to the University of Minnesota Rochester in 2008, she was Professor and Head of the Ecology, Evolution and Behavior department at the Twin Cities campus. At the University of Minnesota Twin Cities, she worked as the director of Research Computing. She was the university's Director of Graduate Studies for the Bioinformatics and Computational Biology graduate program from 2008 to 2017. She was also a member of the Biochemistry, Molecular Biology and Biophysics; Computer Science and Engineering; and Ecology, Evolution and Behavior departments at the university. As of July 1, 2024, she holds the title of Vice President/Vice Chancellor for Research at the University of Houston.

== Publications ==
=== Books ===
Neuhauser is the author of Calculus for Biology and Medicine, an innovative calculus textbook written for students of the life sciences. The volume includes a lengthy chapter on probability and statistics and requires no formal training in biology. First published by Prentice Hall in 2000, a fourth edition of the textbook was published in 2018.

=== Articles ===
- Neuhauser, C., & Krone, S. M. (1997). The genealogy of samples in models with selection. Genetics, 145(2), 519–534. https://doi.org/10.1093/genetics/145.2.519.
- Krone, S. M., & Neuhauser, C. (1997). Ancestral processes with selection. Theoretical Population Biology, 51(3), 210–237. https://doi.org/10.1006/tpbi.1997.1299
- Bolker, B. M., Pacala, S. W., & Neuhauser, C. (2003). Spatial dynamics in model plant communities: What do we really know? American Naturalist, 162(2), 135–148. https://doi.org/10.1086/376575
- Kerr, B., Neuhauser, C., Bohannan, B. J. M., & Dean, A. M. (2006). Local migration promotes competitive restraint in a host-pathogen 'tragedy of the commons'. Nature, 442(7098), 75–78. https://doi.org/10.1038/nature04864

== Recognition ==
In 2011, Neuhauser was elected as a fellow of the American Association for the Advancement of Science. In 2012, she became one of the inaugural fellows of the American Mathematical Society.
