= Ward Whitt =

American professor of operations research and management sciences

- Born: January 29, 1942 (age 84); Bozeman, Montana, U.S.
- Education: Dartmouth College; Cornell University
- Known for: Queueing theory
- Awards: John von Neumann Theory Prize (2001); Frederick W. Lanchester Prize (2003); National Academy of Engineering
- Scientific career
- Fields: operations research
- Workplaces: Columbia University; Yale University; Stanford University
- Thesis: Weak Convergence Theorems for Queues in Heavy Traffic (1969)
- Doctoral advisor: Donald Lee Iglehart
- Doctoral students: Susan Albin; Linda V. Green

Ward Whitt (born January 29, 1942) is an American professor of operations research and management sciences. He is a professor emeritus of the Industrial Engineering and Operations Research department of Columbia University. His research focuses on queueing theory, performance analysis, stochastic models of telecommunication systems, and numerical transform inversion. He is recognized for his contributions to the understanding and analyses of complex queues and queuing networks, which led to advances in the telecommunications system.

== Biography ==
Whitt was born in Bozeman, Montana in 1942. He received an A.B. in Mathematics from Dartmouth in 1964, and in 1969 completed a Ph.D. in operations research from Cornell under the supervision of Donald Lee Iglehart. His doctoral thesis, Weak Convergence Theorems for Queues in Heavy Traffic, paved the path for his future research. Whitt joined the operations research faculty at Stanford before moving to Yale in 1969. From 1977 to 2002, he worked in Bell Labs and then AT&T Labs. Since 2002, he has been a full professor in the Department of Industrial Engineering and Operations Research (IEOR) at Columbia. He was appointed Wai T. Chang Professor in 2007, and is currently professor emeritus.

== Honors ==
Whitt received numerous accolades for his seminal contributions to operations research. He holds a number of telecommunications-related patents. He has been on the editorial boards of major management science journals including Operations Research. He is a member of Institute for Operations Research and the Management Sciences (INFORMS) and Institute of Mathematical Statistics. He has also been a member and committee chair in the National Academy of Engineering. From 1999 to 2001, Whitt has been on the INFORMS prize committee.

== Awards ==
- 2003 INFORMS Frederick W. Lanchester Prize
- 2002 Inaugural INFORMS Fellow
- 2001 John von Neumann Theory Prize
- 2001 Harold Larnder Prize
- 1997 AT&T Fellow
- 1996 National Academy of Engineering Member

== Selected publications ==
Books

- Whitt, Ward (2002). Stochastic-Process Limits. Springer Series in Operations Research and Financial Engineering. Springer-Verlag. doi:10.1007/b97479. ISBN 978-0-387-95358-8.

Articles

- — (1980). "Some Useful Functions for Functional Limit Theorems". Mathematics of Operations Research. 5 (1): 67–85. doi:10.1287/moor.5.1.67.
- — (1983). "The Queueing Network Analyzer". The Bell System Technical Journal. 62 (9): 2779–2815. doi:10.1002/j.1538-7305.1983.tb03204.x.
- Fendick, Kerry; Whitt, Ward (2024). "On Gaussian Markov processes and Polya processes". Operations Research Letters. 52. doi:10.1016/j.orl.2023.107062.
