= Ruth J. Williams =

American mathematician

- Born: Australia
- Education: University of Melbourne; Stanford University
- Known for: Probability theory Stochastic process
- Awards: John von Neumann Theory Prize
- Scientific career
- Fields: Mathematics
- Workplaces: University of California, San Diego
- Thesis: Brownian motion in a wedge with oblique reflection at the boundary (1983)
- Doctoral advisor: Chung Kai-lai

Ruth Jeannette Williams is an Australian-born American mathematician at the University of California, San Diego where she holds the Charles Lee Powell Chair as a Distinguished Professor of Mathematics. Her research concerns probability theory and stochastic processes.

== Early life and education ==
Williams was born in Australia and moved to the United States in 1978.

Williams graduated from the University of Melbourne with a Bachelor of Sciences, with honors, in 1976 and a Master of Science in mathematics in 1978. Williams went on to earn her Ph.D. from Stanford University in 1983, under the supervision of Chung Kai-lai.

== Recognition ==
Williams was president of the Institute of Mathematical Statistics from 2011 to 2012.

Williams is a member of the National Academy of Sciences and a fellow of the American Academy of Arts and Sciences, the American Association for the Advancement of Science, the American Mathematical Society, the Institute of Mathematical Statistics, the Institute for Operations Research and the Management Sciences, and the Society for Industrial and Applied Mathematics. In 1998 she was an Invited Speaker of the International Congress of Mathematicians in Berlin. Williams was an American Mathematical Society (AMS) Council member at large.

Her other awards and honors include:

- Alfred P. Sloan Fellow (1988)
- Guggenheim Fellow (2001)
- Best Publication Award of the INFORMS Applied Probability Society (2007), jointly with Amber L. Puha and H. Christian Gromoll
- John von Neumann Theory Prize (2016), jointly with Martin I. Reiman for "seminal research contributions over the past several decades, to the theory and applications of stochastic networks/systems and their heavy traffic approximations".
- Honorary Doctorate from the University of Melbourne (2018)
- Award for the Advancement of Women in Operations Research and the Management Sciences (2017), annual INFORMS meeting
- Honorary Doctor of Science degree from La Trobe University in Australia
- National Science Foundation Presidential Young Investigator
