= David Sánchez =

David Sánchez may refer to:

== Politics ==
- David Sánchez Juliao (1945–2011), Colombian author and diplomat
- David Sánchez Camacho (born 1963), Mexican politician
- David Sánchez Heredia (born 1966), Bolivian politician
- David Sánchez Guevara (born 1974), Mexican politician
- David Luna Sánchez (born 1975), Colombian politician
- David Sanchez (activist) (born 1947), Chicano activist

== Sports ==
- David Sánchez (tennis) (born 1978), Spanish tennis player
- David Sánchez (footballer, born 1978) (David Sánchez Parrilla), Spanish footballer
- David Sánchez (footballer, born 1982) (David Sánchez Rodríguez), Spanish footballer
- David Sánchez (boxer) (1992–2017), Mexican boxer
- David Sánchez (weightlifter) (born 1994), Spanish weightlifter
- David Sánchez (footballer, born 1998) (David Sánchez Mallo), Spanish footballer
- David Sanchez (engineer), French Formula One engineer

== Others ==
- David Sánchez Morales (1925–1978), American Central Intelligence Agency operative
- David A. Sánchez (born 1933), Mexican-American mathematician
- David Sánchez (musician) (born 1968), Puerto Rican saxophonist

== See also ==
- David Sancious (born 1953), American multi-instrumentalist, best known as keyboard and guitar player
