= Richard A. Tapia =

American mathematician (1939–2026)

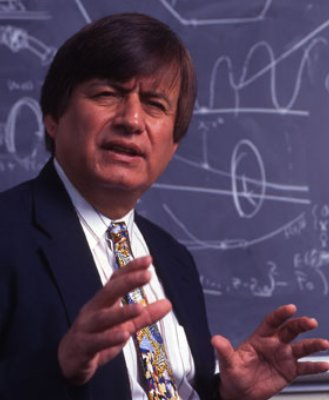
- Tapia in 2011
- Born: Richard Alfred Tapia; March 25, 1938; Santa Monica, California, U.S.
- Died: May 22, 2026 (aged 88); Houston, Texas, U.S.
- Education: University of California, Los Angeles (BA, MA, PhD)
- Known for: Mathematical optimization
- Awards: Presidential Award for Excellence in Science, Mathematics, and Engineering Mentoring; National Medal of Science; Vannevar Bush Award
- Scientific career
- Fields: Mathematics
- Workplaces: Rice University
- Thesis: A Generalization of Newton's Method with an Application to the Euler-Lagrange Equation (1968)
- Doctoral advisor: Magnus Hestenes; Charles Brown Tompkins
- Other academic advisors: David A. Sánchez
- Doctoral students: Jorge Nocedal; Maria Cristina Villalobos

Richard Alfred Tapia (March 25, 1938 – May 22, 2026) was an American mathematician and academic. He held the title of University Professor at Rice University in Houston, Texas, the university's highest academic rank. In 1996 President Bill Clinton awarded Tapia the Presidential Award for Mathematics, Science, and Engineering Mentoring. In 2011 President Barack Obama awarded Tapia the National Medal of Science. He was the Maxfield and Oshman professor of engineering; associate director of graduate studies, Office of Research and Graduate Studies; and director of the Center for Excellence and Equity in Education at Rice University.

Tapia's mathematical research was centered on mathematical optimization and iterative methods for nonlinear problems, with his most recent work focused on algorithms for constrained optimization and interior point methods for linear and nonlinear programming.

== Early life and education ==
Richard Alfred Tapia was born on March 25, 1938, in Santa Monica, California, to Amado and Magda Tapia, who both immigrated to the United States from Mexico. He and his twin brother were the oldest of five siblings, with two younger brothers and sister. His father worked for Japanese-American horticulturists in southern California. He was a first generation college student to continue his education.

Tapia received his BA in mathematics in 1961 from the University of California, Los Angeles. He then earned his M.A. in mathematics, also from UCLA, in 1966. In 1968, he received his PhD from UCLA in mathematics with the dissertation "A Generalization of Newton's Method with an Application to the Euler–Lagrange Equation", under advisors Magnus Hestenes and Charles Tompkins.

== Career ==
His professional academic career began in 1968 when he accepted an assistant professor position at the Mathematics Research Center (MRC) at the University of Wisconsin-Madison. After two years there, he moved to Rice, where he remained.

=== University positions ===
- 1968–1970: Assistant Professor, Army Mathematics Research Center, University of Wisconsin–Madison
- 1970–1972: Assistant Professor of Mathematical Sciences, Rice University
- 1972–1976: Associate Professor of Mathematical Sciences, Rice University
- 1976–?: Professor of Mathematical Sciences, Rice University
- 1978–1983: Chair, Department of Mathematical Sciences, Rice University
- 1978–1983: Adjunct Professor, T.I.R.R., (then called the Texas Institute for Rehabilitation and Research) Baylor College of Medicine
- 1986–1988: Lecturer, Department of Community Medicine, Baylor College of Medicine
- 1989–2000: Director of Education and Outreach Programs, Center for Research on Parallel Computation, Rice University
- 1989–?: Associate Director of Graduate Studies, Office of Research and Graduate Studies, Rice University
- 1991–2005: Noah Harding Professor of Computational and Applied Mathematics, Rice University
- 1999–?: Director, Center for Excellence and Equity in Education, Rice University
- 2000–?: Adjunct Professor, College of Natural Sciences and Mathematics, University of Houston
- 2005–2026: Maxfield and Oshman Professor of Engineering, Rice University
- 2005–2026: University Professor, Rice University

=== External positions ===
- 1978–1991: Editor, SIAM Journal on Numerical Analysis
- 1981–1996: Editor, Journal of Optimization Theory and Applications
- 1989–1992: Member, SIAM Board of Trustees
- 1990–1991: Editor, SIAM Journal on Optimization
- 1992–1994: Member, Mathematical Sciences Education Board, National Research Council
- 1992: Member, National Academy of Engineering
- 1996–2002: Member, National Science Board
- 2001-2004: Chair, Board on Higher Education and the Workforce, National Research Council

=== Publications ===
Tapia published two books and authored or co-authored over 100 research papers in mathematics.

In 2022 Tapia published Losing the Precious Few: How America Fails to Educate its Minorities in Science and Engineering. This book examines the lack of representation of domestic minority groups in STEM fields, identifying key causes such as standardized testing, gaps in K-12 education, and racial biases. He emphasizes the importance of improving access to higher education to address this disparity. The book offers insights for educators, students, and parents on fostering a more inclusive academic environment.

Books

- Tapia, Richard A.; Thompson, J.R. (1978). Nonparametric Density Estimation. Baltimore, Maryland: Johns Hopkins University Press.
- Tapia, Richard A.; Thompson, J.R. (1990). Nonparametric Function Estimation, Modeling, and Simulation. Philadelphia, Pennsylvania: Society for Industrial and Applied Mathematics (SIAM).

== Personal life and death ==
Tapia married Jean Rodriguez Tapia. They were married 63 years at the time of her death in November 2022. They had three children. Their daughter, Circee, was killed by a drunk driver in 1982.

Tapia died in 2026 in Houston at 88 from liver cancer. (Note: Published articles give his age as 88 at the time of death; though, other sources give his birthdate in March 1939)

== Awards and honors ==
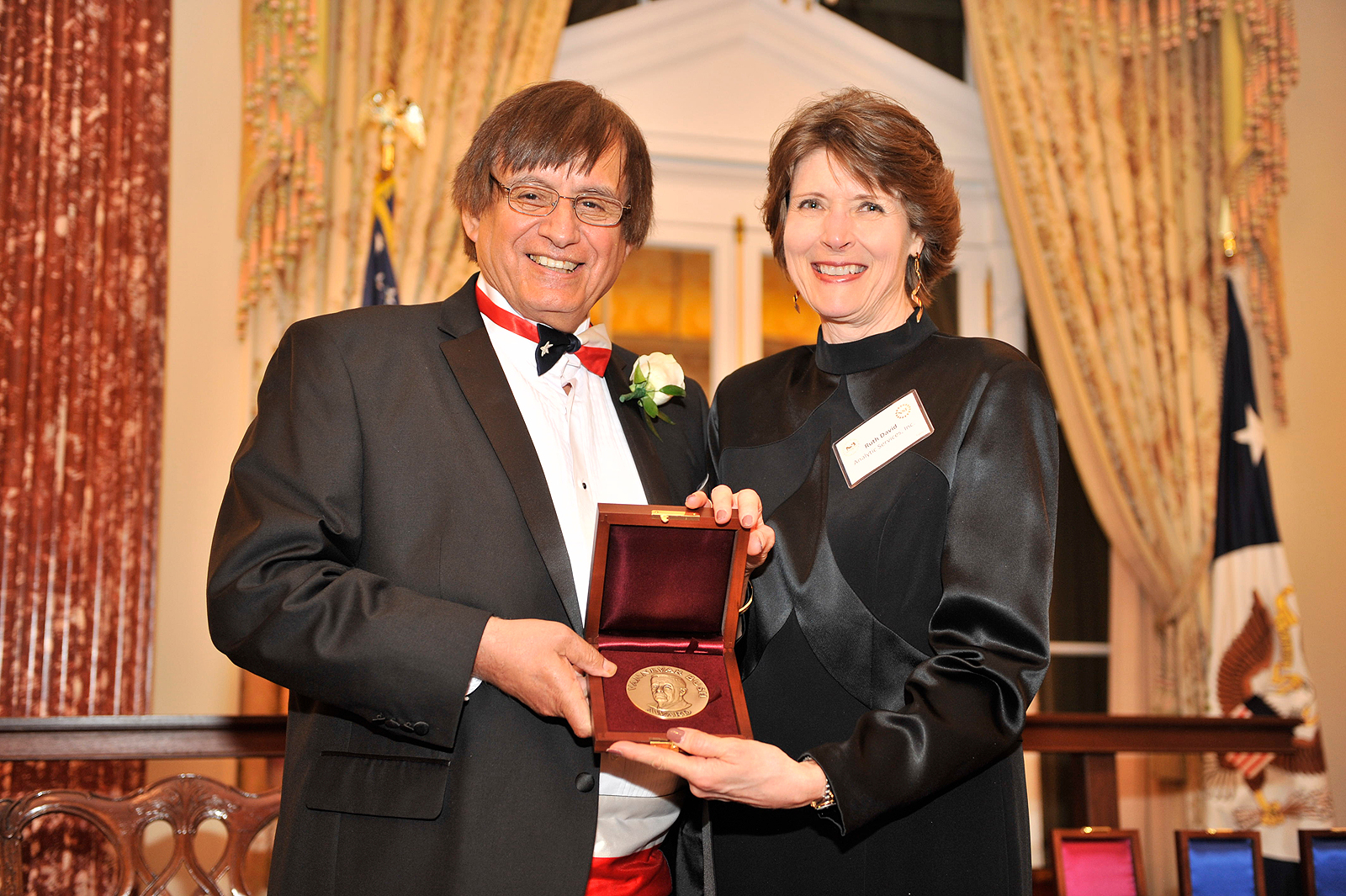
Tapia accepting the Vannevar Bush Award in 2014.

In 1992 Tapia became the first Hispanic elected to the National Academy of Engineering.

In 1996 President Bill Clinton awarded Tapia the Presidential Award for Science, Mathematics, and Engineering Mentoring. That year, Clinton appointed Tapia to the National Science Board, where he served until 2002.

In 2001 the first ACM Richard Tapia Celebration of Diversity in Computing Conference was held in Houston with 164 attendees. The annual conference has grown to include thousands of attendees.

In 2004 Tapia received the Society for Industrial and Applied Mathematics (SIAM) Prize for Distinguished Service to the Profession, in Portland, and Distinguished Public Service Award, American Mathematical Society, in Phoenix.

In 2009 he received Hispanic Heritage Award in Math and Science.

In 2010 he was awarded the National Medal of Science (Mathematics And Computer Science) "For his pioneering and fundamental contributions in optimization theory and numerical analysis and for his dedication and sustained efforts in fostering diversity and excellence in mathematics and science education." He received the award at the White House from President Barack Obama on October 21, 2011.

In 2014 Tapia received the Vannevar Bush Award from the National Science Board for "his distinguished contributions to mathematics [and] extraordinary leadership in increasing opportunities for underrepresented minorities in science and mathematics", according to Ruth David, chair of the NSB's Committee on Honorary Awards. Also in 2014, the Blackwell-Tapia prize and conference were named for Tapia and David Blackwell.

In 2016 Tapia received the American Association for the Advancement of Science (AAAS) Public Engagement with Science Award, recognizing him for his contributions to science, technology, engineering and mathematics education and public engagement.

In 2021 he was named a Fellow of the American Mathematical Society.

In 2026 the Harris County commissioners unanimously voted to name the newly constructed Beltway 8 ship-channel bridge the Dr. Richard A. Tapia Bridge. The commissioners noted that the structure was one of the most prominent pieces of infrastructure in the nation to be named after a Hispanic leader.

Tapia received honorary doctorates from Carnegie Mellon University and the Colorado School of Mines.

== See also ==
- Army Mathematics Research Center at. the University of Wisconsin–Madison
- Baylor College of Medicine
- National Science Foundation
- National Academy of Engineering
- SACNAS Scientist Award, Society for the Advancement of Hispanics/Chicanos and Native Americans in Science
- Vannevar Bush Award
