= Uriel Rothblum =

- אוריאל רוטבלום
- Born: March 16, 1947; Tel-Aviv, Israel.
- Died: March 26, 2012 (aged 65); Haifa, Israel.
- Citizenship: Israel, United States
- Education: Tel Aviv University B.S and M.S.; Stanford Ph.D.
- Scientific career
- Fields: Mathematics; operation research; system analysis
- Workplaces: Technion; New York University; Yale

Uriel George "Uri" Rothblum (Hebrew: אוריאל ג'ורג' "אורי" רוטבלום; Tel Aviv, March 16, 1947 – Haifa, March 26, 2012) was an Israeli mathematician and operations researcher. From 1984 until 2012 he held the Alexander Goldberg Chair in Management Science at the Technion – Israel Institute of Technology in Haifa, Israel.

Rothblum was born in Tel Aviv to a family of Jewish immigrants from Austria. He went to Tel Aviv University, where Robert Aumann became his mentor; he earned a bachelor's degree there in 1969 and a master's in 1971. He completed his doctorate in 1974 from Stanford University, in operations research, under the supervision of Arthur F. Veinott. After postdoctoral research at New York University, he joined the Yale University faculty in 1975, and moved to the Technion in 1984.

Rothblum became president of the Israeli Operational Research Society (ORSIS) for 2006–2008, and editor-in-chief of Mathematics of Operations Research from 2010 until his death. He was elected to the 2003 class of Fellows of the Institute for Operations Research and the Management Sciences.
