= Topkis's theorem =

Theorem in mathematical economics

In mathematical economics, Topkis's theorem is a result that is useful for establishing comparative statics. The theorem allows researchers to understand how the optimal set for a choice variable changes when a feature of the environment changes. The result is especially helpful for establishing comparative static results when the objective function is not differentiable. It is named after Donald M. Topkis.

== Statement ==
In one common fixed-choice-set formulation, let $D$ be a lattice, and let $f$ be supermodular in $x$ and have increasing differences in $(x,\theta)$. Whenever the set of maxima is nonempty,

$$x^*(\theta)=\arg\max_{x\in D}f(x,\theta),$$

is increasing in $\theta$ as a correspondence (i.e., in the strong set order). Under standard existence conditions, the greatest and least selections from this correspondence are nondecreasing in $\theta$.

== Example ==
This example will show how using Topkis's theorem gives the same qualitative result as using more standard tools. The advantage of using Topkis's theorem is that it can be applied to a wider class of problems than can be studied with standard economics tools.

A driver is driving down a highway and must choose a speed, s. Going faster is desirable, but is more likely to result in a crash. There is some prevalence of potholes, p. The presence of potholes increases the probability of crashing. Note that s is a choice variable and p is a parameter of the environment that is fixed from the perspective of the driver. The driver seeks to $\max_{s\in S}U(s,p)$, where S is the feasible set of speeds.

We would like to understand how the driver's speed changes with the amount of potholes; in a differentiable, single-valued benchmark this can be written as:

$$\frac{\partial s^{\ast }(p)}{\partial p}.$$

If one wanted to solve the problem with standard tools such as the implicit function theorem, one would have to assume that the problem is well behaved: U(.) is twice continuously differentiable, $U_{ss}(s^{\ast }(p),p)<0$, the domain over which s is defined is convex, there is a unique maximizer $s^{\ast }(p)$ for every value of p, and $s^{\ast }(p)$ is in the interior of the set over which s is defined. Note that the optimal speed is a function of the amount of potholes. Taking the first order condition, we know that at the optimum, $U_{s}(s^{\ast }(p),p)=0$. Differentiating the first order condition with respect to p and using the implicit function theorem, we find that

$$U_{ss}(s^{\ast}(p),p)(\partial s^{\ast }(p)/(\partial p))+U_{sp}(s^{\ast }(p),p)=0$$

or that

$$\frac{\partial s^{\ast }(p)}{\partial p}
= \frac{-U_{sp}(s^{\ast }(p),p)}{U_{ss}(s^{\ast }(p),p)}.$$

Since $U_{ss}(s^{\ast }(p),p)<0$,

$$\frac{\partial s^{\ast }(p)}{\partial p}\overset{\text{sign}}{=}U_{sp}(s^{\ast }(p),p).$$

If s and p are substitutes,

$$U_{sp}(s^\ast (p),p)<0$$

and hence

$$\frac{\partial s^{\ast }(p)}{\partial p}<0$$

and more potholes cause a lower optimal speed.

The problem with the above approach is that it relies on differentiability of the objective function, concavity in the choice variable, and uniqueness and interiority of the optimum. We can get the same monotone comparative static using Topkis's theorem by assuming directly that U has decreasing differences in $(s,p)$: for any $s'>s$ and $p'>p$,

$$U(s',p')-U(s,p')\leq U(s',p)-U(s,p).$$

This condition says that a higher prevalence of potholes lowers the incremental payoff from choosing a higher speed; it does not require derivatives or concavity. When U is twice differentiable, decreasing differences is implied by the negative cross partial condition $\frac{\partial^2 U}{\partial s\,\partial p}<0$.

If the feasible speed set S is a lattice and optimal speeds exist, the order-dual version of Topkis's theorem implies that the maximal and minimal optimal speeds are nonincreasing in p. If the maximizer is unique, $s^{\ast}(p)$ is nonincreasing in p.

Thus, in cases where the differentiable and concave approach is available, both approaches give the same qualitative prediction. The Topkis argument, however, uses an order condition—decreasing differences—rather than differentiability, concavity, interiority or uniqueness, and therefore applies to discrete, kinked, or nonconcave problems as well.
