= Frank Proschan =

American statistician and operations researcher (1921–2003)

Frank Proschan (April 7, 1921 – December 27, 2003) was a mathematical statistician and operations researcher. He was emeritus professor of statistics at Florida State University. He and Richard E. Barlow are credited as the founders of reliability testing. Proschan was a fellow of the American Statistical Association and of the Institute of Mathematical Statistics.

== Education and career ==
Proschan was born and raised in poverty in a one-bedroom tenement in New York City. He earned his BSc in mathematics from the City College of New York in 1941. He then had a series of jobs at the National Bureau of Standards (NBS), the United States Geological Survey, and back to the NBS. He attended George Washington University part-time and earned his MSc in statistics in 1948. While working at Sylvania Electric Products, he enrolled in Stanford University and earned his PhD in statistics in 1960. His PhD thesis, Polya-Type Distributions in Renewal Theory, with an Application to an Inventory Problem, was written under the tutelage of Herbert Scarf. His thesis won the Ford Foundation Doctoral Dissertation Award.

While at Sylvania, Proschan met Barlow who also studied for his PhD at Stanford. They collaborated on The Mathematical Theory of Reliability in 1966 and went on to write Statistical Theory of Reliability and Life Testing in 1975. These texts are considered to be the first to develop the probability theory that is the foundation of reliability testing. For their "important contributions to all aspects of reliability theory, including stochastic modeling, optimization, statistical inference and engineering design" they were awarded the John von Neumann Theory Prize by the Operations Research Society of America (now the Institute for Operations Research and the Management Sciences [INFORMS]).

After completing his PhD, Proschan joined Boeing Scientific Research Laboratories where he stayed for ten years. In 1970, he joined the Department of Statistics at Florida State University, taking emeritus status in 1992. While at Florida State, he was appointed as the Robert O. Lawton Distinguished Professor.

== Acknowledgements ==
In addition to the aforementioned Ford Foundation Thesis Award and the John von Neumann Prize, Proschan received a number of awards and acknowledgements. He was an elected fellow of the American Statistical Association (1965), INFORMS (2002),, and the Institute of Mathematical Statistics. In 1982, he was awarded the Wilks Memorial Award by the American Statistical Association. He was an elected member of the International Statistical Institute.

== Selected publications ==
=== Books ===
- Barlow, Richard E.; Proschan, Frank (1966). Mathematical Theory of Reliability. Philadelphia: SIAM. doi:10.1137/1.9781611971194. ISBN 978-0-89871-369-5.
- Barlow, Richard E.; Proschan, Frank (1975). Statistical Theory of Reliability and Life Testing: Probability Models. New York: Holt, Rinehart and Winston. ISBN 0-03-085853-4.
- Hollander, Myles; Proschan (1984). The Statistical Exorcist: Dispelling Statistics Anxiety. CRC Press. ISBN 978-0-8247-7225-3.
- Pecaric, Josip E.; Proschan, Frank; Tong, Y. L. (1992). Convex Functions, Partial Orderings, and Statistical Applications. Boston: Academic Press. ISBN 978-0-08-092522-6.

=== Peer-reviewed journal articles ===
- Esary, J. D.; Proschan, F.; Walkup, D. W. (1967). "Association of Random Variables, with Applications" (PDF). The Annals of Mathematical Statistics. 38 (5): 1466–1474. doi:10.1214/aoms/1177698701. ISSN 0003-4851.
- Joag-Dev, Kumar; Proschan, Frank (March 1, 1983). "Negative Association of Random Variables with Applications". The Annals of Statistics. 11 (1). doi:10.1214/aos/1176346079. ISSN 0090-5364.

=== Technical reports ===
- Barlow, Richard E.; Proschan, Frank; Scheuer, Ernest M. (1966). "Maximum Likelihood Estimation and Conservative Confidence Interval Procedures in Reliability Growth and Debugging Problems". RAND.
- Barlow, Richard E.; Proschan, Frank; Scheuer, Ernest M. (1966). "Statistical Estimation Procedures for the "Burn-In" Process". RAND.
- Proschan, Frank; Singpurwalla, Nozer (1978). Accelerated Life Testing - A Pragmatic Bayesian Approach (PDF) (Report). The Florida State University - Department of Statistics.
- Proschan, Frank; Singpurwalla, Nozer (1978). A New Approach to Inference from Accelerated Life Tests (PDF) (Report). Department of Statistics, Stanford University.
