= Richard E. Barlow =

American mathematician (1931–2024)

Richard Eugene Barlow
- Born: January 12, 1931; Galesburg, Illinois, U.S.
- Died: 2024 (aged 92–93)
- Education: Knox College; University of Oregon; Stanford University
- Children: 4
- Awards: John von Neumann Theory Prize
- Scientific career
- Fields: Reliability theory
- Workplaces: University of California, Berkeley
- Thesis: Applications of Semi-Markov Processes to Counter and Reliability Problems (1961)
- Academic advisors: Samuel Karlin
- Doctoral students: Telba Irony; Yosi Ben-Dov

Richard Eugene Barlow (January 12, 1931 – 2024) was an American mathematician and mathematical statistician, who is considered with Frank Proschan as the founder of modern reliability theory. He was a professor at the University of California, Berkeley from 1963 until his retirement in 1999.

He introduced the concept of "Total Time on Test" processes in reliability theory. He and Proschan cowrote the book Mathematical Theory of Reliability.

== Biography ==
Barlow received his bachelor's degree in mathematics from Knox College in 1953 and his master's degree in mathematics from the University of Oregon in 1955. In 1961 he received his doctorate in mathematical statistics from Stanford University under Samuel Karlin. His dissertation was titled Applications of Semi-Markov Processes to Counter and Reliability Problems. After graduation, he worked at the Institute for Defense Analyses for a year. He was from 1963 until his retirement in 1999 a professor at UC Berkeley. While at Berkeley, he mentored several doctoral students in operations research.

He was a guest scientist at the Boeing Laboratories in 1966 and at Florida State University in 1975 and 1976 (with Frank Proschan). From 1963 to 1969 he was an advisor to the Rand Corporation.

In addition to reliability theory, he dealt with probabilistic modeling in Bayesian statistics and statistical data analysis.

In 1991 he was awarded the John von Neumann Theory Prize with Frank Proschan. He is a Fellow of the Institute of Mathematical Statistics, the American Statistical Association, and the Institute for Operations Research and the Management Sciences.

== Personal life and death ==
He is married since 1956 and has four children.

Barlow died in 2024, at the age of 92–93.
