= Jorge Nocedal =

Mexican mathematician and computer scientist (born 1952)

- Born: 1952 (age 73–74)
- Education: National University of Mexico (BS); Rice University (PhD)
- Awards: John Von Neumann Theory Prize
- Scientific career
- Workplaces: Northwestern University
- Thesis: On the Method of Conjugate Gradients for Function Minimization (1978)
- Doctoral advisor: Richard A. Tapia

Jorge Nocedal (born 1952) is an applied mathematician, computer scientist and the Walter P. Murphy professor at Northwestern University who in 2017 received the John Von Neumann Theory Prize. He was elected a member of the National Academy of Engineering in 2020.

Nocedal specializes in nonlinear optimization, both in the deterministic and stochastic setting. The motivation for his current algorithmic and theoretical research stems from applications in image and speech recognition, recommendation systems, and search engines. In the past, he has also worked on equilibrium problems with application in robotics, traffics, and games, optimization applications in finance, as well as PDE-constrained optimization.

== Biography ==
Nocedal was born and raised in Mexico. He obtained a B.Sc. in physics from the National University of Mexico in 1974. From 1974 to 1978, Nocedal studied at Rice University, where he obtained a PhD in mathematical sciences under the supervision of Richard A. Tapia. Prior to joining Northwestern University in 1983, Nocedal spent three years (1978–1981) as an assistant professor at the National University of Mexico and two years (1981–1983) as a research assistant at the Courant Institute of Mathematical Sciences at NYU. Nocedal joined the Electrical Engineering and Computer Sciences department at Northwestern University in 1983. He held this appointment until 2012, before joining the Industrial Engineering and Management Sciences department, where he served as the David and Karen Sachs Professor and chair from 2013 to 2017.

== Contributions ==
Nocedal is well known for his research in nonlinear optimization, particularly for his work on L-BFGS and his textbook Numerical Optimization.

In 2001, Nocedal co-founded Ziena Optimization Inc. and co-developed the KNITRO software package. Nocedal was a chief scientist at Ziena Optimization Inc. from 2002 to 2012 before the company was subsequently bought by Artelys in 2015.

== Awards and honors ==
Nocedal has won numerous awards in the fields of nonlinear optimization, applied mathematics and operations research. In 1998, he was an invited speaker to the International Congress of Mathematicians in Berlin. He was named an ISI Highly Cited Researcher in 2004. He received the George B. Dantzig Prize in 2012 and the Charles Broyden Prize in 2009. He was also named a SIAM Fellow in 2010. In 2017, he received the INFORMS John Von Neumann Theory Prize. Nocedal was elected a member of the National Academy of Engineering in 2020 for contributions to the theory, design, and implementation of optimization algorithms and machine learning software.
