= Arthur F. Veinott =

American operations researcher (1934–2012)

- Born: October 12, 1934; Boston, Massachusetts, US
- Died: December 12, 2012 (aged 78); Stanford, California, US
- Education: Lehigh University; Columbia University
- Known for: Strong set order
- Scientific career
- Fields: Operations research
- Workplaces: United States Air Force; Stanford University
- Thesis: Optimal ordering, issuing, and disposal of inventory with known demand (1960)
- Doctoral advisor: Cyrus Derman
- Notable students: James B. Orlin, Uriel Rothblum

Arthur Fales Veinott Jr. (October 12, 1934 – December 12, 2012), also known as Pete Veinott was an American operations researcher and academic.

== Early life and education ==
Born in Boston, Massachusetts on October 12, 1934.

He earned his Bachelors of Arts and Science degrees from Lehigh University in 1956. He studied at Columbia University and earned a Doctorate of Science in 1960, under the supervision of Cyrus Derman.

He died on December 12, 2012.

== Career ==
He first arrived at Stanford in 1962 and served until 2009. During his career, he played a key role in the creation and development of the Department of Operations Research, including serving as department chair from 1975 to 1985.

He founded the journal Mathematics of Operations Research.

== Awards and honours ==
- He received the INFORMS John von Neumann Theory Prize in 2007.
- He was made an inaugural INFORMS Fellow in 2002.
- He was elected to the National Academy of Engineering in 1986.

== See also ==
- Stanford University
- Operations Research
