= James B. Orlin =

American operations researcher (born 1953)

- Born: April 19, 1953 (age 73)
- Education: University of Pennsylvania (BS 1974); California Institute of Technology (MS 1976); University of Waterloo (MMath 1976); Stanford University (PhD 1981)
- Awards: INFORMS Fellow (2006)
- Scientific career
- Fields: Operations research
- Workplaces: MIT Sloan School of Management
- Doctoral advisor: Arthur Fales Veinott
- Website: mitmgmtfaculty.mit.edu/jorlin/

James B. Orlin (born April 19, 1953) is an American operations researcher and professor at the MIT Sloan School of Management, where he holds the E. Pennell Brooks Professorship in Management. His research focuses on network optimization, combinatorial optimization, and the design and analysis of algorithms.

Orlin is a co-author, with Ravindra K. Ahuja and Thomas L. Magnanti, of Network Flows: Theory, Algorithms, and Applications (1993), which received the Frederick W. Lanchester Prize.

== Early life and education ==
Orlin was born in Buffalo, New York.He received a bachelor's degree in mathematics from the University of Pennsylvania in 1974.He earned a master's degree in mathematics from the California Institute of Technology and a Master of Mathematics degree from the University of Waterloo in 1976. In 1981, he completed a PhD in operations research at Stanford University, where he studied under Arthur Fales Veinott.

== Academic career ==
Orlin joined the faculty of the Massachusetts Institute of Technology in 1979 as an assistant professor at the Sloan School of Management. He became an associate professor in 1983 and a full professor in 1987. In 1998, he was appointed the Edward Pennell Brooks Professor of Operations Research.

From 1993 to 2000, Orlin headed the Management Science Area at MIT Sloan. He served as co-director of MIT's Operations Research Center from 1998 to 2006, initially alongside Thomas L. Magnanti.

== Research ==
Orlin's research concerns mathematical programming, network optimization, graph algorithms, and computational methods for discrete optimization problems. His work addresses the computational complexity and efficiency of algorithms for maximum flows, minimum-cost flows, shortest paths, minimum cuts, and related problems.

In 1988, Orlin presented a strongly polynomial algorithm for the minimum-cost flow problem, subsequently published in Operations Research in 1993.

Orlin contributed to the Human Genome Project between 1992 and 1995. He was among the co-authors of the 1995 paper "An STS-Based Map of the Human Genome", published in Science (journal), which described the construction of a physical map of the human genome containing more than 15,000 sequence-tagged sites. The research provided a framework for subsequent large-scale human genome sequencing.

=== Shortest paths and Maximum flows ===
His research also contributed to algorithms for minimum cuts, including a 1994 paper with Jianxiu Hao introducing a faster algorithm for finding a minimum cut in a graph.

In 2013, Orlin published "Max Flows in O(nm) Time, or Better" in the proceedings of the ACM Symposium on Theory of Computing. The work established that the maximum-flow problem could be solved within an O(nm) time bound, where n represents the number of vertices and m the number of edges in a network. It improved the running-time bound for certain sparse networks.

Orlin has contributed to research on the shortest path problem. In 1990, he co-authored "Faster Algorithms for the Shortest Path Problem", which introduced efficient algorithms using radix heap data structures.

In 2006, a paper co-authored by Orlin, János Csirik, David S. Johnson, Claire Kenyon, Peter Shor, and Richard Weber analyzed the sum-of-squares algorithm for the bin packing problem. The paper received the 2007 INFORMS Computing Society Prize.

In 1991, he and John J. Bartholdi III published "Single Transferable Vote Resists Strategic Voting" in Social Choice and Welfare. The paper examined the computational difficulty of manipulating elections conducted under the single transferable vote system. The paper received the 2016 ACM SIGecom Test of Time Award.

In 1993, Orlin co-authored Network Flows: Theory, Algorithms, and Applications with Ravindra K. Ahuja and Thomas L. Magnanti. The book received the 1993 Frederick W. Lanchester Prize from the Operations Research Society of America.

== Awards and recognition ==
- 1993 Frederick W. Lanchester Prize, jointly with Ravindra K. Ahuja and Thomas L. Magnanti, for Network Flows: Theory, Algorithms, and Applications.
- 2006 Elected Fellow of the Institute for Operations Research and the Management Sciences (INFORMS).
- 2007 Margaret MacVicar Faculty Fellowship, Massachusetts Institute of Technology.
- 2007 INFORMS Computing Society Prize
- 2008 IEEE Leonard G. Abraham Prize
- 2011 IEEE William R. Bennett Prize
- 2013 Harold Larnder Prize, awarded by the Canadian Operational Research Society.
- 2016 ACM SIGecom Test of Time Award
- 2020 INFORMS Optimization Society Khachiyan Prize

== Selected publications ==
=== Book ===
- Ahuja, Ravindra K.; Magnanti, Thomas L.; Orlin, James B. (1993). Network Flows: Theory, Algorithms, and Applications. Prentice Hall. ISBN 978-0-13-617549-0.

=== Research articles ===
- Karp, Richard M.; Orlin, James B. (1981). "Parametric Shortest Path Algorithms with an Application to Cyclic Staffing". Discrete Applied Mathematics. 3 (1): 37–45. doi:10.1016/0166-218X(81)90026-3.
- Orlin, James B. (1993). "A Faster Strongly Polynomial Minimum Cost Flow Algorithm". Operations Research. 41 (2): 338–350. doi:10.1287/opre.41.2.338.
- Hao, Jianxiu; Orlin, James B. (1994). "A Faster Algorithm for Finding the Minimum Cut in a Graph". Journal of Algorithms. 17 (3): 424–446. doi:10.1006/jagm.1994.1043.
- Csirik, János; Johnson, David S.; Kenyon, Claire; Orlin, James B.; Shor, Peter W.; Weber, Richard R. (2006). "On the Sum-of-Squares Algorithm for Bin Packing". Journal of the ACM. 53 (1): 1–65. arXiv:cs/0210013. doi:10.1145/1120582.1120583.
- Orlin, James B. (2013). "Max Flows in O(nm) Time, or Better". Proceedings of the Forty-Fifth Annual ACM Symposium on Theory of Computing. pp. 765–774. doi:10.1145/2488608.2488705. hdl:1721.1/88020.
- Orlin, James B.; Végh, László A. (2023). "Directed Shortest Paths via Approximate Cost Balancing". Journal of the ACM. 70 (1): 1–33. arXiv:2007.07975. doi:10.1145/3565019.
- Dadush, Daniel; Orlin, James B.; Sidford, Aaron; Végh, László A. (2026). "From Incremental Transitive Cover to Strongly Polynomial Maximum Flow". Proceedings of the 2026 Annual ACM-SIAM Symposium on Discrete Algorithms. pp. 150–163. arXiv:2510.20368. doi:10.1137/1.9781611978971.7.
