= Herbert Scarf =

American economist

Herb Scarf
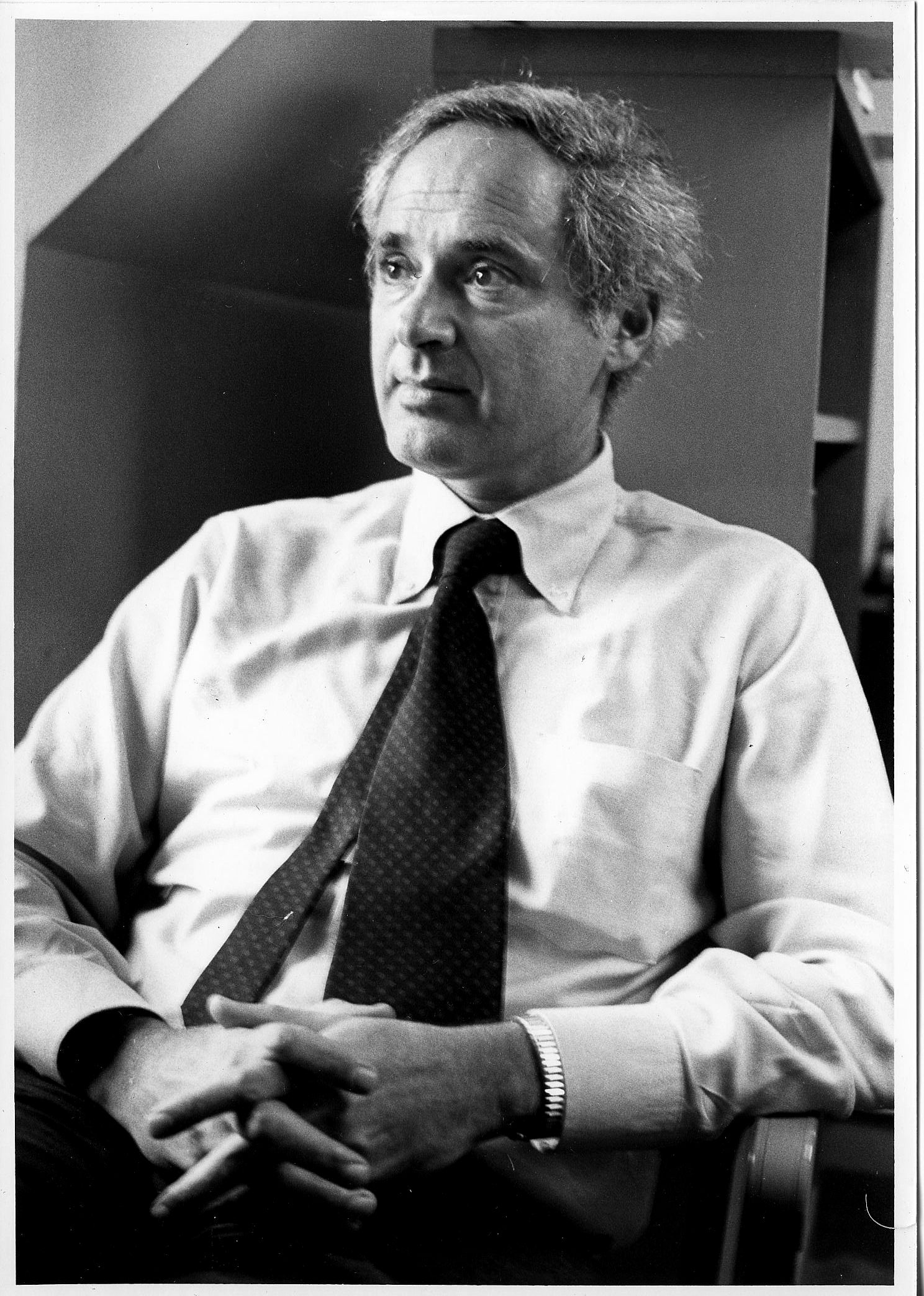
- Born: Herbert Eli Scarf; July 25, 1930; Philadelphia, Pennsylvania, U.S.
- Died: November 15, 2015 (aged 85); Sag Harbor, New York, U.S.

Academic background
- Education: Temple University (BA); Princeton University (MA, PhD)
- Doctoral advisor: Salomon Bochner

Academic work
- Discipline: Economics, Mathematics
- Institutions: Yale University
- Doctoral students: Duncan K. Foley; Donald Iglehart; Timothy Kehoe; Rolf Mantel; Frank Proschan; John Shoven; Ludo Van der Heyden; Menahem Yaari
- Awards: John von Neumann Theory Prize (1983)
- Website: Information at IDEAS / RePEc

Herbert Eli "Herb" Scarf (July 25, 1930 – November 15, 2015) was an American mathematical economist and Sterling Professor of Economics at Yale University.

== Education and career ==
Scarf was born in Philadelphia, the son of Jewish emigrants from Ukraine and Russia, Lene (Elkman) and Louis Scarf. He had a twin brother, noted space physicist Frederick L. Scarf. During his undergraduate work he finished in the top 10 of the 1950 William Lowell Putnam Mathematical Competition, the major mathematics competition between universities across the United States and Canada. He received his PhD from Princeton in 1954, supervised by Salomon Bochner.

== Contributions ==
Among his notable works is a seminal paper in cooperative game in which he showed sufficiency for a core in general balanced games. Sufficiency and necessity had been previously shown by Lloyd Shapley for games where players were allowed to transfer utility between themselves freely. Necessity is shown to be lost in the generalization.

== Recognition ==
Scarf received the 1973 Frederick W. Lanchester Award for his contribution The Computation of Economic Equilibria with the collaboration of Terje Hansen, which pioneered the use of numeric algorithms to solve general equilibrium systems using Applied general equilibrium models. He was a member of the American Academy of Arts and Sciences, the National Academy of Sciences, and the American Philosophical Society, and was elected to the 2002 class of Fellows of the Institute for Operations Research and the Management Sciences.
