= Donald L. Iglehart =

American computer scientist

Donald Lee Iglehart
- Born: May 11, 1933 (age 93); United States
- Education: Stanford University
- Known for: Queueing theory
- Awards: John von Neumann Theory Prize (2002)
- Scientific career
- Fields: operations research
- Workplaces: Stanford University
- Thesis: Dynamic Programming and Stationary Analysis of Inventory Problems (1961)
- Doctoral advisor: Herbert Scarf and Samuel Karlin
- Doctoral students: Ward Whitt; Rick Durrett

Donald Lee Iglehart (born 1933) is an American computer scientist and researcher.

== Biography ==
He was born on 11 May 1933.

== Education ==
He completed his PhD at Stanford University in 1961.

His doctoral dissertation supervisors were Herbert Eli Scarf and Samuel Karlin.

== Career ==
He became a full professor at Stanford University in 1967.

He supervised the doctoral dissertations of several notable PhD students, these include: Ward Whitt, Rick Durrett and Roger C. Glassey.

== Awards and honours ==
He was jointly awarded the John von Neumann Theory Prize in 2002 with Cyrus Derman for their fundamental contributions to performance analysis and optimization of stochastic systems.

== See also ==
- Cyrus Derman
- Herbert Scarf
- Samuel Karlin
