= Susan Albin =

American industrial engineer

Susan Lee Albin is an American industrial engineer known for her research in quality engineering, queueing theory, and industrial process monitoring. She is a professor of industrial engineering at Rutgers University, the former president of the Institute for Operations Research and the Management Sciences, and the former editor-in-chief of IIE Transactions (now IISE Transactions), the flagship journal of the Institute of Industrial and Systems Engineers.

== Education and career ==
Albin is a 1971 graduate of New York University (NYU), in industrial engineering, and earned a master's degree from NYU in 1973. She completed a doctorate in engineering science from Columbia University in 1981, specializing in operations research and industrial engineering. Her dissertation was Approximating queues with superposition arrival processes, and was supervised by Ward Whitt. She was a researcher at Bell Labs and the Albert Einstein College of Medicine before becoming a faculty member at Rutgers University.

Albin has worked as a visiting professor in mechanical engineering at Peninsula Technikon, a predecessor institution to the Cape Peninsula University of Technology in South Africa, where she helped found a program in quality engineering. She was president of the Institute for Operations Research and the Management Sciences (INFORMS) in 2010, and is also a founder of the INFORMS Section on Quality, Statistics and Reliability and of WORMS (Women in OR/MS).

== Recognition ==
Albin is a Fellow of the Institute of Industrial and Systems Engineers. In 2012, INFORMS gave her their George E. Kimball Medal in recognition of her service, particularly citing her work at Peninsula Technikon. She was named a Fellow of INFORMS in 2020.
