= Maria Cristina Villalobos =

American applied mathematician

- Born: McAllen, Texas, US
- Education: University of Texas at Austin (BS); Rice University (PhD)
- Scientific career
- Fields: Mathematics
- Workplaces: University of Texas Rio Grande Valley
- Thesis: The behavior of Newton's method on two equivalent systems from linear and nonlinear programming (2000)
- Doctoral advisor: Richard A. Tapia

Maria Cristina Villalobos is an American applied mathematician at the University of Texas Rio Grande Valley, where she is Myles and Sylvia Aaronson Endowed Professor of mathematics, associate dean of sciences, and director of the Center of Excellence in STEM Education. Her research interests include mathematical optimization, control theory, and their application to retinitis pigmentosa treatment and to antenna design.

== Early life and education ==
Villalobos was born in McAllen, Texas and grew up in Donna, Texas, both in the Rio Grande Valley, the oldest of three children of two immigrants from Mexico, and the first in her family with a college education. After participating in engineering programs at the University of Texas–Pan American as a high school student, she did her undergraduate studies in mathematics at the University of Texas at Austin, also including summer research programs at Rice University, the University of California, Berkeley, and the Sandia National Laboratories.

She went to Rice University for graduate study in mathematics, and completed her doctorate there in 2000. Her dissertation, The Behavior of Newton's Method on Two Equivalent Systems from Linear and Nonlinear Programming, was supervised by Richard A. Tapia.

== Career ==
She became a faculty member in mathematics at the University of Texas–Pan American in 2001; the university merged with the University of Texas at Brownsville creating the present University of Texas Rio Grande Valley, where she continues to work. In 2019 she was named associate dean for strategic initiatives and institutional effectiveness.

== Recognition ==
The University of Texas system gave Villalobos their 2013 Regents’ Outstanding Teaching Award. She was also the 2013 winner of the SACNAS Distinguished Undergraduate Institution Mentor Award of the Society for the Advancement of Chicanos/Hispanics and Native Americans in Science. She won the 2019 Richard A. Tapia Achievement Award for Scientific Scholarship, Civic Sciences, and Diversifying Computing. She was one of three 2020 recipients of the Presidential Award for Excellence in Science, Mathematics, and Engineering Mentoring.

She was named to the 2023 class of Fellows of the American Mathematical Society, "for contributions to modelling and optimization and for broadening the participation of underrepresented groups in mathematics". In 2024, she received the M. Gweneth Humphreys Award from the Association for Women in Mathematics for outstanding mentorship.
