= Linda V. Green =

Linda Vogel Green is an American management scientist and operations researcher. She specializes in the mathematical modeling of health care services, and has also made important contributions to systems for the deployment of emergency vehicles. She is the Cain Brothers and Company Professor of Healthcare Management at the Columbia Business School of Columbia University.

Green graduated from the City College of New York in 1970, earned a master's degree in 1973 from New York University, and completed her Ph.D. in 1978 at Yale University. Her dissertation, Queues Which Allow A Random Number of Servers Per Customer, concerned queueing theory, and was jointly supervised by Daniel P. Heyman and Ward Whitt. She joined the Columbia Business School faculty in 1978.

Green was elected to the 2004 class of Fellows of the Institute for Operations Research and the Management Sciences (INFORMS). In 2019 she was chosen as a Distinguished Fellow of the INFORMS Manufacturing and Service Operations Management Society.
