= Timothy Kehoe =

American economist (born 1953)

Timothy J. Kehoe
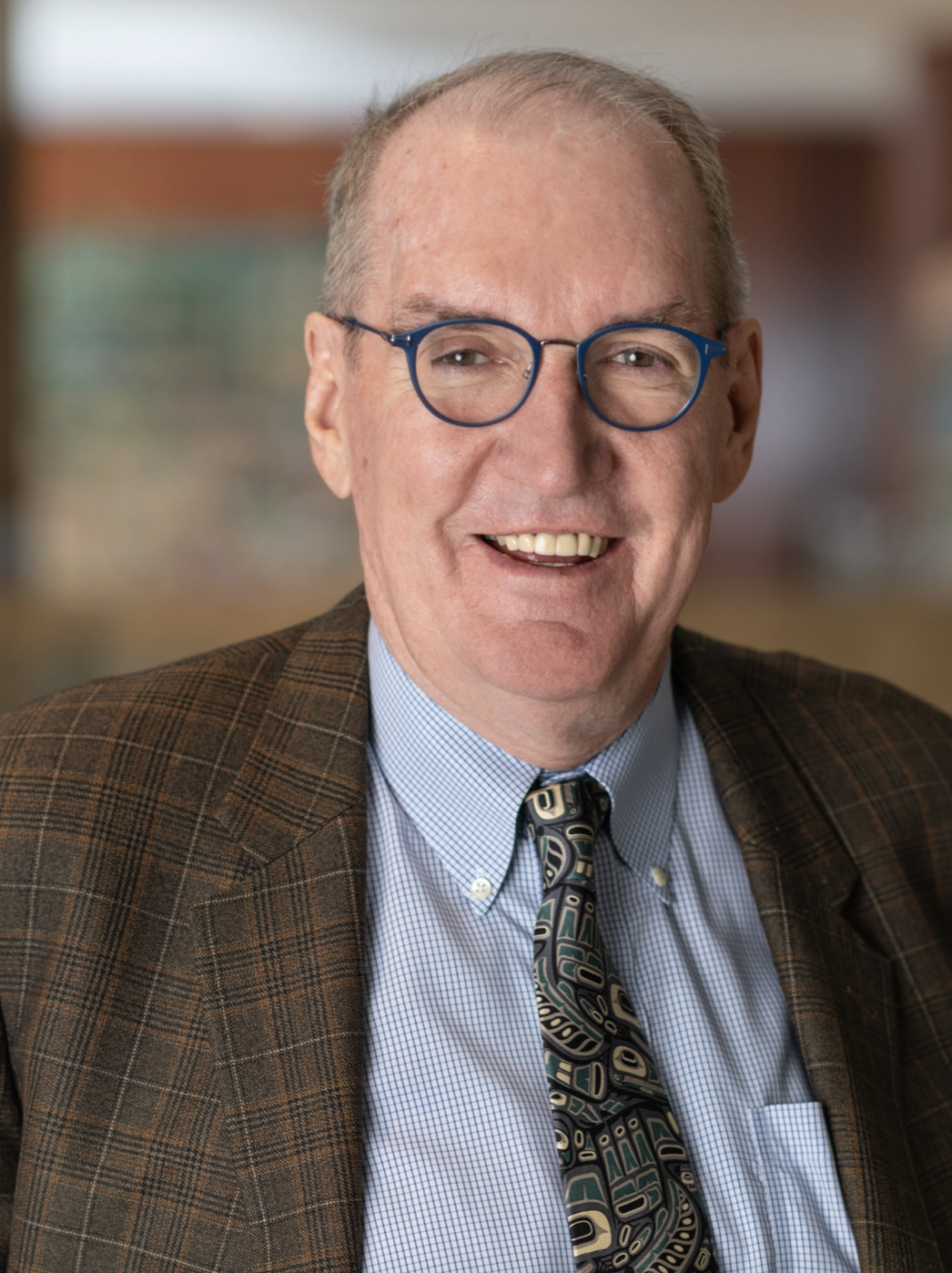
- Born: June 13, 1953 (age 73)

Academic background
- Education: Yale University; Providence College
- Doctoral advisor: Herbert Scarf; Andreu Mas-Colell

Academic work
- Institutions: University of Minnesota; MIT; Wesleyan University
- Doctoral students: Michael Woodford; Raphael Bergoeing
- Notable ideas: "Citations".
- Website: Information at IDEAS / RePEc

Timothy Jerome Kehoe (born June 13, 1953) is an American economist and professor at the University of Minnesota. His area of specialty is macroeconomics and international economics.

He obtained his undergraduate degree from Providence College in 1975 and his Ph.D. in economics from Yale University in 1979. His Ph.D. supervisor was Herbert Scarf.

Since 2015, Professor Kehoe is the president of the Society for Economic Dynamics.

He was awarded the Guggenheim Fellowship in 2015.

He is a member of the board of trustees and the scientific council at the IMDEA Social Sciences Institute.

== Life and family ==
Kehoe is married to historian Jean O'Brien, the McKnight University Professor of History at the University of Minnesota. His younger brother, Patrick Kehoe, is also a macroeconomic theorist.

== Education ==
Kehoe received his B.A. in Mathematics/Economics from Providence College in 1975. He then proceeded to obtain M.A. in economics from Yale University in 1977 and Ph.D. in economics from Yale University in 1979. His thesis committee was composed of Herbert E. Scarf as the supervisor, Andreu Mas-Colell as the co-supervisor, and Donald J. Brown as the reader.

== Positions ==
Teaching positions

Professor Kehoe started his teaching career as a lecturer and then assistant professor at Wesleyan University from 1978 to 1980. From 1980 to 1984, he was an assistant professor and then associate professor at the Massachusetts Institute of Technology. From 1984 to 1987 he was a university lecturer at the University of Cambridge and a fellow of Clare College. Since 1987 he has been a professor at the University of Minnesota.

Other positions

Kehoe was a consultant to the Banco de México from 1980 to 1982 and a consultant to the World Bank from 1982 to 1983. Then, he took roles as members of Economics Societies. He was also a research visitor at Federal Reserve Bank of Minneapolis from 1987 to 2000, a research associate at the National Bureau of Economic Research's Economic Fluctuations and Growth Program from 2006 to present, and a research associate at Center for the Advanced Study in Economic Efficiency (CASEE) in Arizona State University from 2010 to present.

== Research ==
Kehoe's research focuses mainly on Monetary and Fiscal History of Latin America Project, the Great Depressions Project, trade theory, and capital flows and real exchange rates. Other research topics vary from gambling and debt crises, policy reform, macroeconomic effects of medicare, opportunity costs of entrepreneurs in international trade, and quantitative trade models, etc. Geographically, his research has spanned over various countries in different continents, such as the United States, Mexico, Chile, Argentina, Spain, and China, etc.

== Publications ==
Kehoe's publications vary from books and edited volumes to journal articles, book reviews, and Spanish and Catalan publications.

== Awards ==
Kehoe has received fellowship, honors, and grants since 1971.Teaching awards are granted such as Presidential Scholarship in Providence College (1971–1975), University Fellowship in Yale University (1975–1979), Distinguished McKnight University Professor in University of Minnesota (1996–present). Research honors are granted such as Faculty Interactive Research Program Grant from the Center for Urban and Regional Affairs in University of Minnesota (1992–1993) and U.S. Air Force Office of Scientific Research Grant (1995–1997). Fellowships include Fellow in Econometric Society (1991–present), Economic Theory Fellow in Society for Advancement of Economic Theory (2011–present), and so on.

He was awarded an honorary doctorate by the University of Vigo in 2008 and by the Autonomous University of Barcelona in 2016.
