= Telba Irony =

Brazilian statistician

Telba Zalkind Irony
- Born: São Paulo, Brazil
- Education: University of São Paulo; University of California, Berkeley
- Scientific career
- Fields: Statistics; Operations research
- Institutions: George Washington University; Food and Drug Administration
- Thesis: Modeling, Information Extraction and Decision Making a Bayesian Approach to Some Engineering Problems (1989)
- Doctoral advisor: Richard E. Barlow

Telba Zalkind Irony is a Brazilian statistician, operations researcher, and proponent of Bayesian statistics. After working at the Food and Drug Administration, as chief of biostatistics at the Office of Device Evaluation and deputy director of biostatistics and epidemiology at the Center for Biologics Evaluation and Research, she moved to Janssen R&D, a division of Johnson & Johnson, as Senior Scientific Director in Quantitative Sciences.

Irony was born in São Paulo, and studied physics and statistics at the University of São Paulo, earning both a bachelor's degree and master's degree there. She obtained her Ph.D. in industrial engineering and operations research in 1989 from the University of California, Berkeley with a dissertation Modeling, Information Extraction and Decision Making a Bayesian Approach to Some Engineering Problems supervised by Richard E. Barlow. Irony was an assistant professor of operations research in the department of engineering at George Washington University from 1990 to 1998. She joined the Food and Drug Administration in 1998, where she works in the biostatistics division.

In 2010, she became a Fellow of the American Statistical Association. In 2014, she won the Excellence in Analytical Science Award of the Food and Drug Administration "for spearheading innovative regulatory science studies, culminating in the release of novel guidance documents; supporting complex policy decision-making; and changing the submission review paradigm".
