= John von Neumann Theory Prize =

Operations research and management sciences award

- Awarded for: Fundamental, sustained contributions to theory in operations research and the management sciences
- First award: 1975
- Website: John von Neumann Theory Prize

The John von Neumann Theory Prize of the Institute for Operations Research and the Management Sciences (INFORMS) is awarded annually to an individual (or sometimes a group) who has made fundamental and sustained contributions to theory in operations research and the management sciences.

The Prize named after mathematician John von Neumann is awarded for a body of work, rather than a single piece. The Prize was intended to reflect contributions that have stood the test of time. The criteria include significance, innovation, depth, and scientific excellence.

The award is $5,000, a medallion and a citation.

The Prize has been awarded since 1975. The first recipient was George B. Dantzig for his work on linear programming.

== List of recipients ==
- 2025 Renato Monteiro
- 2024 Jim Dai
- 2023 Christos Papadimitriou and Mihalis Yannakakis
- 2022 Vijay Vazirani
- 2021 Alexander Shapiro
- 2020 Adrian Lewis
- 2019 Dimitris Bertsimas and Jong-Shi Pang
- 2018 Dimitri Bertsekas and John Tsitsiklis
  - for contributions to Parallel and Distributed Computation as well as Neurodynamic Programming.
- 2017 Donald Goldfarb and Jorge Nocedal
  - for seminal contributions to the theory and applications of nonlinear optimization over the past several decades.
- 2016 Martin I. Reiman and Ruth J. Williams
  - for seminal research contributions over the past several decades, to the theory and applications of “stochastic networks/systems” and their “heavy traffic approximations.”
- 2015 Vašek Chvátal and Jean Bernard Lasserre
  - for seminal and profound contributions to the theoretical foundations of optimization.
- 2014 Nimrod Megiddo
  - for fundamental contributions across a broad range of areas of operations research and management science, most notably in linear programming, combinatorial optimization, and algorithmic game theory.
- 2013 Michel Balinski
- 2012 George Nemhauser and Laurence Wolsey
- 2011 Gérard Cornuéjols, IBM University Professor of Operations Research at Carnegie Mellon University's Tepper School of Business
  - for his fundamental and broad contributions to discrete optimization including his deep research on balanced and ideal matrices, perfect graphs and cutting planes for mixed-integer optimization.
- 2010 Søren Asmussen and Peter W. Glynn
- 2009 Yurii Nesterov and Yinyu Ye
- 2008 Frank Kelly
- 2007 Arthur F. Veinott, Jr.
  - for his profound contributions to three major areas of operations research and management science: inventory theory, dynamic programming and lattice programming.
- 2006 Martin Grötschel, László Lovász and Alexander Schrijver
  - for their fundamental path-breaking work in combinatorial optimization.
- 2005 Robert J. Aumann
  - in recognition of his fundamental contributions to game theory and related areas
- 2004 J. Michael Harrison
  - for his profound contributions to two major areas of operations research and management science: stochastic networks and mathematical finance.
- 2003 Arkadi Nemirovski and Michael J. Todd
  - for their seminal and profound contributions in continuous optimization.
- 2002 Donald L. Iglehart and Cyrus Derman
  - for their fundamental contributions to performance analysis and optimization of stochastic systems
- 2001 Ward Whitt
  - for his contributions to queueing theory, applied probability and stochastic modelling
- 2000 Ellis L. Johnson and Manfred W. Padberg
- 1999 R. Tyrrell Rockafellar
- 1998 Fred W. Glover
- 1997 Peter Whittle
- 1996 Peter C. Fishburn
- 1995 Egon Balas
- 1994 Lajos Takacs
- 1993 Robert Herman
- 1992 Alan J. Hoffman and Philip Wolfe
- 1991 Richard E. Barlow and Frank Proschan
- 1990 Richard Karp
- 1989 Harry M. Markowitz
- 1988 Herbert A. Simon
- 1987 Samuel Karlin
- 1986 Kenneth J. Arrow
- 1985 Jack Edmonds
- 1984 Ralph Gomory
- 1983 Herbert Scarf
- 1982 Abraham Charnes, William W. Cooper, and Richard J. Duffin
- 1981 Lloyd Shapley
- 1980 David Gale, Harold W. Kuhn, and Albert W. Tucker
- 1979 David Blackwell
- 1978 John F. Nash and Carlton E. Lemke
- 1977 Felix Pollaczek
- 1976 Richard Bellman
- 1975 George B. Dantzig for his work on linear programming

There is also an IEEE John von Neumann Medal awarded by the IEEE annually "for outstanding achievements in computer-related science and technology".

== See also ==
- IEEE John von Neumann Medal
- List of engineering awards
- List of mathematics awards
- Prizes named after people
