= Rick Durrett =

American mathematician

Richard Timothy Durrett
- Education: Emory University (BS, MS); Stanford University (PhD)
- Scientific career
- Fields: Mathematics (Probability theory) · Mathematical biology
- Workplaces: UCLA · Cornell University · Duke University
- Thesis: Conditioned Limit Theorems for Some Null Recurrent Markov Processes (1976)
- Doctoral advisor: Donald Iglehart

Richard Timothy Durrett (born 1951) is an American mathematician who is the James B. Duke Emeritus Professor of Mathematics at Duke University. His research concerns probability theory, stochastic processes, and their applications to mathematical biology, including population genetics, ecology, epidemiology, and cancer modeling. He previously held positions at the University of California, Los Angeles and Cornell University.

Durrett was elected to the United States National Academy of Sciences in 2007 and to the American Academy of Arts and Sciences in 2002. He is also a fellow of the American Mathematical Society, the Institute of Mathematical Statistics, and the American Association for the Advancement of Science. His textbook Probability: Theory and Examples was described in a review for the Mathematical Association of America as one of the two most popular graduate-level texts on probability, alongside Billingsley's Probability and Measure.

== Education ==
Durrett received his bachelor of science (1972) and master of science (1973) degrees in mathematics from Emory University. He then entered the Operations Research program at Stanford University, where he completed his Ph.D. in 1976 under the supervision of Donald Iglehart. His doctoral dissertation, titled Conditioned Limit Theorems for Some Null Recurrent Markov Processes, appeared in the Annals of Probability in 1976.

Durrett initially enrolled at Emory as a pre-medical student during the Vietnam War era, but switched to mathematics after drawing number 343 in the second draft lottery. He later enrolled in the operations research program at Stanford to avoid having to move back home when he was unable to find employment.

== Career ==
Durrett began his academic career at the University of California, Los Angeles (UCLA) in 1976 as an E. R. Hedrick Assistant Professor and was promoted through the ranks to full professor, remaining at UCLA until 1985. In 1985 he joined the faculty of Cornell University.

In 2010, Durrett moved to Duke University as the James B. Duke Professor of Mathematics, a position he held until his retirement in 2023. He was drawn to Duke partly by the milder climate of North Carolina and partly by the opportunities for collaboration with biologists, medical researchers, and applied mathematicians at Duke. Upon retirement he became the James B. Duke Emeritus Professor of Mathematics.

Durrett has supervised doctoral students, including Rodrigo Bañuelos (UCLA, 1984). He was an editor of the Annals of Applied Probability from 1997 to 1999 and has been involved in organizing programs at the Mathematical Biosciences Institute and the Banff International Research Station (BIRS).

== Research ==
Durrett's early research focused on interacting particle systems, percolation theory, and contact processes, building on the frameworks developed by Thomas M. Liggett and Frank Spitzer. His 1980 paper with T. M. Liggett determined the shape of the limit set in Richardson's model for the spread of an infection.

In the late 1980s, Durrett began a long-running collaboration with ecologist Simon Levin on stochastic spatial models in ecology. Their 1994 paper The Importance of Being Discrete (and Spatial) argued that spatial structure can qualitatively change the dynamics of ecological interactions and is among the most cited papers in mathematical ecology. Their subsequent papers studied species–area curves, allelopathy, interspecific competition, and the spread of epidemics using interacting particle systems and stochastic spatial models.

Beginning in the late 1990s, Durrett turned to population genetics, working on the evolutionary dynamics of microsatellite repeat length distributions and, with Jason Schweinsberg, on approximating selective sweeps by random partitions. His 2008 paper with Deena Schmidt, Waiting for two mutations, studied the limits of Darwinian evolution in regulatory sequence evolution.

Durrett's later research has applied branching processes and stochastic models to cancer biology, including models of tumor heterogeneity, the evolution of resistance to therapy, and the dynamics of clonal expansion.

A third strand of Durrett's work concerns stochastic processes on random graphs. He showed, with Shirshendu Chatterjee, that contact processes on random graphs with power-law degree distributions have critical value zero—meaning infection can survive for any positive infection rate. His 2010 Inaugural Article as a member of the National Academy of Sciences, published in the Proceedings of the National Academy of Sciences, examined the spread of epidemics and opinions on random graphs.

== Honors and awards ==
Durrett was awarded a Sloan Research Fellowship from the Alfred P. Sloan Memorial Foundation for 1981–1983, and an AMS Centennial Fellowship for 1984–1986. In 1981 he was elected a fellow of the Institute of Mathematical Statistics. He received a Guggenheim Fellowship for 1988–1989.

In 1990 he delivered an invited lecture at the International Congress of Mathematicians in Kyoto. He gave the Coxeter Lectures at the Fields Institute in 1999 and the IMS Wald Lectures at the World Congress of Probability and Statistics in Singapore in 2008.

Durrett was elected to the American Academy of Arts and Sciences in 2002 and to the United States National Academy of Sciences in 2007. He was elected a fellow of the American Association for the Advancement of Science in 2009 and was named a fellow of the American Mathematical Society in the inaugural class of 2012.

== Selected publications ==
=== Books ===
- Durrett, R. (1984). Brownian Motion and Martingales in Analysis. Wadsworth Publishing. ISBN 978-0-534-03065-0.
- Durrett, R. (1988). Lecture Notes on Particle Systems and Percolation. Wadsworth Publishing. ISBN 978-0-534-09478-2.
- Durrett, R. (2019). Probability: Theory and Examples. Cambridge Series in Statistical and Probabilistic Mathematics (5th ed.). Cambridge University Press. ISBN 978-1-108-47368-2.
- Durrett, R. (2008). Probability Models for DNA Sequence Evolution (2nd ed.). Springer. ISBN 978-0-387-78168-6.
- Durrett, R. (2007). Random Graph Dynamics. Cambridge University Press. ISBN 978-0-521-86656-9.
- Durrett, R. (2025). Dynamics on Graphs (2nd ed.). Springer. ISBN 978-3-032-21907-7.
- Durrett, R. (2016). Essentials of Stochastic Processes (3rd ed.). Springer. ISBN 978-3-319-45613-3.
- Durrett, R. (2009). Elementary Probability for Applications. Cambridge University Press. ISBN 978-0-521-86756-6.
- Durrett, R. (2015). Branching Process Models of Cancer. Springer. ISBN 978-3-319-16064-1.

=== Selected research papers ===
- Durrett, R.; Resnick, S. I. (1978). "Functional limit theorems for dependent variables". The Annals of Probability. 6 (5): 829–846. doi:10.1214/aop/1176995325. ISSN 0091-1798.
- Cox, J. T.; Durrett, R. (1981). "Some limit theorems for percolation processes with necessary and sufficient conditions". The Annals of Probability. 9 (4): 583–603. doi:10.1214/aop/1176994365. ISSN 0091-1798.
- Durrett, R. (1984). "Oriented percolation in two dimensions". The Annals of Probability. 12 (4): 999–1040. doi:10.1214/aop/1176993160. ISSN 0091-1798.
- Durrett, R.; Liggett, T. M. (1983). "Fixed points of the smoothing transformation". Zeitschrift für Wahrscheinlichkeitstheorie und Verwandte Gebiete. 64 (3): 275–301. doi:10.1007/BF00535706. ISSN 0044-3719.
- Durrett, R.; Levin, S. (1994). "The importance of being discrete (and spatial)". Theoretical Population Biology. 46 (3): 363–394. Bibcode:1994TPBio..46..363D. doi:10.1006/tpbi.1994.1032. ISSN 0040-5809.
- Durrett, R.; Neuhauser, C. (1994). "Particle systems and reaction-diffusion equations". The Annals of Probability. 22 (1): 289–333. doi:10.1214/aop/1176988855. ISSN 0091-1798.
- Kruglyak, S.; Durrett, R.; Schug, M.; Aquadro, C. (1998). "Equilibrium distributions of microsatellite repeat length resulting from a balance between slippage events and point mutations". Proceedings of the National Academy of Sciences. 95 (18): 10774–10778. doi:10.1073/pnas.95.18.10774. ISSN 0027-8424. PMC 27948. PMID 9724780.
- Durrett, R.; Schweinsberg, J. (2008). "Waiting for two mutations: with applications to regulatory sequence evolution and the limits of Darwinian evolution". Genetics. 180 (1): 1501–1509. doi:10.1534/genetics.107.082971. ISSN 0016-6731. PMC 2535691. PMID 18791261.
- Chatterjee, S.; Durrett, R. (2009). "Contact processes on random graphs with power law degree distributions have critical value zero". The Annals of Probability. 37 (6): 2332–2356. doi:10.1214/09-AOP471. ISSN 0091-1798.
- Durrett, R. (2009). "Coexistence in stochastic spatial models". The Annals of Applied Probability. 19 (2): 477–496. doi:10.1214/08-AAP566. ISSN 1050-5164.
- Durrett, R. (2010). "Some features of the spread of epidemics and opinions on a random graph". Proceedings of the National Academy of Sciences. 107 (10): 4491–4498. doi:10.1073/pnas.0911198107. ISSN 0027-8424. PMC 2842029. PMID 20160135.
