= Adrian Richard Lewis =

American military historian

Dr. Adrian R. Lewis Ph.D
- Education: University of California, Berkeley (BA), University of Michigan at Ann Arbor, (MA) University of Chicago (PhD)
- Occupation: Military historian
- Years active: 1977–present

Adrian R. Lewis is an American historian and U.S. Army veteran. He is the David B. Pittaway Professor of Military History at the University of Kansas, where he has served as a history professor since 2008. He is a former Quincy Institute Fellow.

== Education ==
Lewis earned a Bachelors of Science degree in political science from the University of California, Berkeley. He earned his Masters of Arts from the University of Michigan at Ann Arbor in European and Military history. He also earned his Masters of Business Administration from Southern Illinois University Edwardsville, Edwardsville, Illinois. Lewis earned his Ph.D. at the University of Chicago in 1995 under historian Michael Geyer. His dissertation became his first book, Omaha Beach: A Flawed Victory (2001, University of North Carolina Press). The book analyzes the Normandy Invasion and the battle for Omaha Beach. His second book, The American Culture of War, was published by Routledge, in 2007. (2nd ed, 2012, third, 2018.)

== Military service ==
Lewis is a retired United States Army officer who served in the 9th Infantry Division and the 2nd Ranger Battalion at Fort Lewis, Washington. Consequently, his areas of expertise include national security, 20th-century warfare, military affairs, the Korean War, Vietnam War, World War II (particularly D-Day), and military operations in Iraq and Afghanistan.

== Academic career ==
Lewis has taught at the United States Military Academy, the University of California, Berkeley, and the University of North Texas, Denton, where he chaired the Department of History. He has also taught the Strategy and Policy course for the Naval War College. At the University of Kansas, Lewis served as the first Director of the Office of Professional Military Graduate Education, an office he helped create. This office worked extensively with the U.S. Army Command and General Staff College at Fort Leavenworth, creating new advanced degree programs. This included the creation of the Wounded Warriors Program at the University of Kansas. Lewis specializes in 20th-century warfare: World War II, the Korean and Vietnam Wars, and the more recent military operations, including Operation Iraqi Freedom and Operation Enduring Freedom.

== Honors ==
- University of Kansas, Professorship, David B. Pittaway, 2019
- University of North Texas, Honors Professor, College of Arts and Sciences, 2000–2001

== Publications ==
- The American Culture of War: A History of American Military Force from World War II to the Global War on Terrorism. 3rd Edition. New York: Routledge, 2018.
- The American Culture of War: A History of American Military Force from World War II to Operation Enduring Freedom, 2nd Edition. New York: Routledge, 2012.
- The American Culture of War: A History of American Military Force from World War II to Operation Iraqi Freedom. New York: Routledge, 2007.
- Omaha Beach: A Flawed Victory. Chapel Hill, N.C.: The University of North Carolina Press, 2001.

== Articles and Book Chapters ==
- The American Culture of War in the Age of Artificial Limited War,” Warfare and Culture in World History, Second Edition, edited by Wayne Lee. (New York: New York University Press, 2020).
- “The American Culture of War in the Age of Artificial Limited War,” Warfare and Culture in World History, edited by Wayne Lee. (New York: New York University Press, 2011). The University of Kansas. 06-25-2011. Retrieved 06-18-2023.
- “Conscription, the Republic, and America’s Future,” Military Review, Vol. LXXXIX, No. 6, November–December 2009, 15–24.
- "Military Culture," The All-Volunteer Force: Fifty Years of Service, edited by William A. Taylor. (Lawrence: University Press of Kansas, 2023).

== See also ==
- Bibliography of United States military history
- Military career of Dwight D. Eisenhower
