= David A. Sánchez =

American mathematician

- Born: David Alan Sánchez; January 13, 1933 (age 93)
- Education: B.S. (1955), Univ of New Mexico; M.S. (1960), Univ of Michigan; Ph.D. (1964), Univ of Michigan
- Scientific career
- Fields: differential equations, biomathematics
- Institutions: University of Chicago (1963-1965); University of Manchester (1965-1966); UCLA (1966-1970); Brown University (1970-1971); UCLA (1971-1973); U of Wisconsin (1973-1974); UCLA (1974-1977); Univ of Michigan (1977-1986); University of Wales (1982); Lehigh University (1986-1990); NSF (1990-1992); Los Alamos (1992-1993); Texas A&M (1993- )
- Thesis: Calculus of Variations for Integrals Depending on a Convolution Product
- Doctoral advisor: Lamberto Cesari
- Doctoral students: Richard A. Tapia
David A. Sánchez
- Allegiance: United States of America
- Branch: United States Marine Corps
- Service years: 1956-1959

David A. Sánchez (born January 13, 1933) is a Mexican-American university and research administrator, mathematician, educator, and author. He held the posts of provost at Lehigh University, assistant director for the National Science Foundation and Los Alamos National Laboratory, and assistant Chancellor for the Texas A&M University (TAMU) system; As a mathematician, his areas of focus include ordinary differential equations and biomathematics. He has been a researcher and professor at several universities, including the University of Wisconsin's Mathematics Research Lab, UCLA, and the University of New Mexico. He published his memoir, Don't Forget the Accent Mark: A Memoir, in 2011.

== Biography ==
=== Early life and education ===
David Alan Sánchez was born on January 13, 1933, in San Francisco, California to Berta Sánchez. At the age of three, he moved to Mission Hills in San Diego and was adopted by his grandparents, Cecilio and Concepcion Sánchez.

Sánchez earned his Bachelor of Science (B.S.) in 1955 from the University of New Mexico. After graduating, he served the U.S. Marine Corps for three years.

Sánchez continued with his graduate studies at the University of Michigan (UM), where he worked at their Institute of Science and Technology in the Radar Laboratory. His research involved battlefield simulations for the Army. He received his Master of Science (M.S.) in 1960. He wrote his doctoral dissertation, Calculus of Variations for Integrals Depending on a Convolution Product under the direction Lamberto Cesari; receiving his doctorate (Ph.D.) in 1964 from UM.

=== Personal life ===
In 1957, Sánchez married Joan Thomas. They have two children - a son and a daughter. After he retired from the University of New Mexico, he made his home in Corrales, New Mexico.

== Career ==
=== Academia ===
After completing his Ph.D., Sánchez spent two years at the University of Chicago as an instructor, before traveling to Manchester, England as a visiting professor at Manchester University.

UCLA (1966–1977)
In 1966, Sánchez became an assistant professor at the University of California, Los Angeles (UCLA). While at UCLA, he presented papers at the American Mathematical Societies 1967 meeting, and at the Conference on Qualitative Theory of Nonlinear Differential and Integral Equations in 1968, on extremals of composite functions and Ricotti equations, respectively. After four years, spent a year at Brown University as a visiting professor (1973–1974); and then returned to UCLA as an associate professor. He became a full professor at UCLA in 1976.

University of New Mexico (1977–1986)
In 1977, Sánchez returned to his undergraduate alma mater, the University of New Mexico, as a full professor in the Department of Mathematics and Statistics. He served as the department chairman from 1983 to 1986). He took a sabbatical in 1982 to teach at the University of Wales in Aberystwyth, Ceredigion, Wales.

In 1986, Sánchez took a nine-year detour in his academic career, into administrative roles.

Final posts - Texas A&M and University of New Mexico
In 1995, after serving as assistant Chancellor for Texas A&M, Sánchez returned to a teaching and research role at the university.

Sánchez' returned to the University of New Mexico (UNM) for his final university position before retiring. At UNM, he served as chairman of the Department of Mathematics and Statistics.

=== Administrative career (1986-1995) ===
In 1986, Sánchez took a detour from his traditional academic path to a new career path, accepting a position as the vice president and provost at Lehigh University in Bethlehem, Pennsylvania. While at Lehigh, he restructured the promotion and tenure process; and, chaired a commission on racial diversity. He remained at Lehigh until 1990, when he moved to the National Science Foundation (NSF) to take a two-year term as an assistant director. At the NSF, he headed the Mathematics and Physical Sciences Directorate, the largest division at the NSF, "setting national priorities on scientific research." At the end of his term at the NSF, he took a position as an assistant director for the Los Alamos National Laboratory.

In November 1993, Sánchez moved to the Texas A&M University System as Vice Chancellor for Academic Affairs, to take on long-range planning. His foray into administration lasted for nine years, when he returned to teaching at Texas A&M. (Note: "For nine years he acquired a severe case of administrativitis, but recovered and is happily teaching at Texas A&M University." - P. Littleton)

== Selected publications ==
Sánchez is the author of three books on mathematics and has written over fifty journal articles in the fields of optimization, biomathematics, differential equations, and numerical analysis. Here is a selected list of his publications:

=== Books ===
- Sánchez, David A.; Lakin, William D. (1982). Topics in Ordinary Differential Equations. Dover Publications. ISBN 0486616061.
- Sánchez, David A. (1983). Differential Equations:An Introduction (1st ed.). Addison Wesley Publishing Company. ISBN 0201077604.

- Sánchez, David A. (1988). Differential Equations (2nd ed.). Addison Wesley Publishing Company. ISBN 0201154072.

- Sánchez, David A. (2002). Ordinary Differential Equations: A Brief Eclectic Tour. Classroom Resource Materials. Vol. 19. Washington, DC: Mathematical Association of America. ISBN 0-88385-723-5. (a brief guide to concepts of ordinary differential equations)
- Sánchez, David A. (2012). Ordinary Differential Equations and Stability Theory: An Introduction. Dover Books on Mathematics. Dover Publications. ISBN 978-0486638287.

=== Journals ===
- Sánchez, D. A. (1964). "Total Variation and Uniform Convergence". The American Mathematical Monthly, 71(5), 537–539.
- Sánchez, D. A. (1966). "On Composite Variational Problems". SIAM Journal on Applied Mathematics, 14(1), 60–64.
- Sánchez, D. A. (1968). "On Extremals of Composite Variational Problems". Proceedings of the American Mathematical Society, 19(3), 555–559.
- Sánchez, D. A. (1969). "A Note on Periodic Solutions of Riccati-Type Equations." SIAM Journal on Applied Mathematics, 17(5), 957–959.
- Sánchez, D. A. (1975). "The Green’s Function and Determining Equations". The American Mathematical Monthly, 82(7), 747–749.
- Sánchez, David (1975). "Constant Rate Population Harvesting: Equilibrium and Stability". Theoretical population biology, 8, 12–30.
- Lehmer, E., & Sánchez, D. A. (1980). "Problems Dedicated to Emory P. Starke: S27-S28". The American Mathematical Monthly, 87(3), 218–218.
- Sánchez, D. A. (1998). "Review of Ordinary Differential Equations Texts". The American Mathematical Monthly, 105(4), 377–383.
- Sánchez, D. A. (2001). "An Alternative to the Shooting Method for a Certain Class of Boundary Value Problems". The American Mathematical Monthly, 108(6), 552–555. https://doi.org/10.2307/2695711
- Littleton, P., & Sánchez, D. A. (2001). "Dipsticks for Cylindrical Storage Tanks--Exact and Approximate". The College Mathematics Journal, 32(5), 352–358. https://doi.org/10.2307/2687307
- Sánchez, David. (2008). "Periodic environments and periodic harvesting". Natural Resource Modeling, 16, 233–244.

== See also ==
- Richard A. Tapia - American mathematician, mentored by Sánchez
