= Martin I. Reiman =

- Education: Cornell University; Stanford University
- Awards: John von Neumann Theory Prize (2016)
- Scientific career
- Fields: Operations Research
- Workplaces: Columbia University

Martin I. Reiman is an American engineer and Professor in the Industrial Engineering and Operations Research Department at Columbia University.

== Biography ==
Reiman received his A.B. from Cornell University and his M.S. and Ph.D. from Stanford University. He began his career at Bell Labs in 1977 after graduating from Stanford. He was a Distinguished Member of Technical Staff at Bell Labs from 1998 until 2015. His research has focused on teletraffic theory and stochastic networks.

Reiman joined the faculty of the Fu Foundation School of Engineering and Applied Science at Columbia University in 2017.

== Recognition ==
Reiman received the John von Neumann Theory Prize from INFORMS in 2016.

He was elected to the National Academy of Engineering in 2022 for his "contributions to network theory and applications in large-scale stochastic systems." He is also a Fellow of the Institute for Operations Research and the Management Sciences (INFORMS).
