= Why You Can't Teach United States History without American Indians =

2015 book

Why You Can't Teach United States History without American Indians is a 2015 book by Susan Sleeper-Smith, Juliana Barr, Jean M. O'Brien, Nancy Shoemaker, and Scott Manning Stevens. The book is about adding discussions of Native Americans into United States history courses.

== Content ==
The book is divided has 19 essays and those essays are further divided into three parts titled "U.S. History to 1877," "U.S. History since 1877," and "Reconceptualizing the Narrative." The sixteen essays that makes up the first two parts show how central Native Americans where to the history of the United States. "Reconceptualizing the Narrative", consisting of three essays, are about how readers can reinterpret settler colonialism, federalism, sovereignty, and globalism in the framework of Native American studies. All of the essays include suggested readings, citations, illustrations, and maps.

== Reception ==
Brenden W. Rensink of the Journal of the Native American and Indigenous Studies Association said, "Native peoples, especially Native voices, often do not appear in documentary records and archives, but their influence over the course of American history is undeniable. This makes it all the more frustrating when broad national American narratives are repeated generation after generation with wholly insufficient attention paid to the Native actors and forces that were often at the center of historical events. This volume is a tool to rectify this wrong.". Orian Svingen of American Indian Culture and Research Journal wrote, "Admittedly, the academy and public education are both playing "catch-up" with American Indian history, and a number of American history survey texts are improving their coverage of American Indians. This volume will become increasingly relevant as more states take up the mandate of ensuring that high schools include coverage of American Indian history, tribal government, and culture."

Andrew Denson of the Journal of Southern History praised the book, but said that "the volume would benefit, however, from greater discussion of teaching methods, which only a few of the contributors address directly."
