= J. Michael Harrison =

American researcher (born 1944)

- Born: 1944 (age 81–82)
- Education: Lehigh University; Stanford University
- Scientific career
- Fields: operations research stochastic modelling
- Workplaces: Stanford University
- Thesis: Queueing Models for Assembly-Like Systems (1971)
- Doctoral advisor: Frederick Stanton Hillier
- Website: faculty-gsb.stanford.edu/harrison/

John Michael Harrison (born 1944) is an American researcher, known for his contributions to the theory of operations research, in particular stochastic networks and financial engineering. He has authored two books and nearly 90 journal articles.

He obtained a B.S. in industrial engineering from Lehigh University (1966), a M.S. from Stanford University (1967), and a Ph.D. in operations research (1970) also from Stanford University.

He then worked at the same place, in the Stanford Graduate School of Business, as assistant professor, promoted to associate professor (1973) and full professor (1978). He is currently the Adams Distinguished Professor of Management at Stanford University.

His research focused on stochastic modelling for business and led to influential results in option theory (with David M. Kreps, 1980). Later he studied Brownian network models for logistics and models for optimizing telephone call centers. More recently he has studied dynamic pricing and revenue management.

In 2008, Harrison was elected a member of the National Academy of Engineering for fundamental contributions to stochastic networks and financial engineering.

== Awards ==
- National Academy of Engineering electee (2008).
- 2005 class of Fellows of the Institute for Operations Research and the Management Sciences.
- John von Neumann Theory Prize 2004
- Frederick W. Lanchester Prize (best research publication) 2001
- INFORMS Expository Writing Award 1998

== Selected publications ==
- A Method for Staffing Large Call Centers, Mfg. & Service Operations Mgt., 2005
- A Broader View of Brownian Networks: Annals of Applied Probability, 2003
- Brownian Motion and Stochastic Flow Systems, Wiley and Sons, 1985
- Martingales and Stochastic Integrals in the Theory of Trading Stochastic Processes, 1981
- Martingales and Arbitrage in Multiperiod Securities Markets Journal of Economic Theory, 1979
