= SIAM Journal on Optimization =

Academic journal on mathematical optimization

- Discipline: Mathematical optimization, applied mathematics
- Language: English
- Edited by: Radu Ioan Boț

Publication details
- History: 1991–present
- Publisher: Society for Industrial and Applied Mathematics (United States)
- Frequency: Quarterly
- Open access: Hybrid
- Impact factor: 2.3 (2024)

Standard abbreviations
- ISO 4: SIAM J. Optim.

Indexing
- CODEN: SJOPE8
- ISSN: 1052-6234 (print); 1095-7189 (web)
- LCCN: 91642714

Links
- Journal homepage; Online access; Online archive

SIAM Journal on Optimization (SIOPT; abbreviated SIAM J. Optim.) is a quarterly peer-reviewed academic journal covering mathematical optimization. It is published by the Society for Industrial and Applied Mathematics (SIAM). The journal was established in 1991, and its editor-in-chief is Radu Ioan Boț of the University of Vienna.

== Scope ==
The journal publishes original research on the theory and practice of optimization. Its scope includes linear and quadratic programming, convex and nonlinear programming, complementarity problems, stochastic optimization, combinatorial optimization, integer programming, and convex, nonsmooth, and variational analysis. Articles may focus on optimization theory, algorithms, software, computational practice, applications, or connections among these areas.

Submissions are handled through SIAM's Journal Submission & Tracking System. According to SIAM's review process, the editor-in-chief assigns an associate editor, the associate editor assigns referees, and a publication decision is made after review.

== Abstracting and indexing ==
The journal is covered by bibliographic and citation services including DBLP, MathSciNet, SCImago Journal Rank, and the Science Citation Index Expanded. According to the Journal Citation Reports, the journal had a 2024 impact factor of 2.3.

== See also ==
- Mathematical optimization
- Society for Industrial and Applied Mathematics
- SIAM Journal on Control and Optimization
- Mathematical Programming (journal)
