= Mathematics of Operations Research =

- Discipline: Mathematics
- Language: English
- Edited by: Katya Scheinberg

Publication details
- History: Feb. 1976-present
- Publisher: Institute for Operations Research and the Management Sciences
- Frequency: Quarterly
- Impact factor: 1.9 (2024)

Standard abbreviations
- ISO 4: Math. Oper. Res.

Indexing
- CODEN: MOREDQ
- ISSN: 0364-765X (print); 1526-5471 (web)
- LCCN: 76647217
- OCLC no.: 692909490

Links
- Journal homepage

Mathematics of Operations Research is a quarterly peer-reviewed scientific journal established in February 1976. It focuses on areas of mathematics relevant to the field of operations research such as continuous optimization, discrete optimization, game theory, machine learning, simulation methodology, and stochastic models. The journal is published by INFORMS (Institute for Operations Research and the Management Sciences). the journal has a 2024 impact factor of 1.9.

== History ==
The journal was established in 1976. The founding editor-in-chief was Arthur F. Veinott Jr. (Stanford University). He served until 1980, when the position was taken over by Stephen M. Robinson, who held the position until 1986. Erhan Cinlar served from 1987 to 1992, and was followed by Jan Karel Lenstra (1993-1998). Next was Gérard Cornuéjols (1999-2003) and Nimrod Megiddo (2004-2009). Finally came Uri Rothblum (2009-2012), Jim Dai (2012-2018), and the current editor-in-chief Katya Scheinberg (2019–present).

The journal's three initial sections were game theory, stochastic systems, and mathematical programming. Currently, the journal has four sections: continuous optimization, discrete optimization, stochastic models, and game theory.

== Notable papers ==
The following papers have been cited most frequently:

1. Roger B. Myerson, "Optimal Auction Design", vol 6:1, 58-73
2. A. Ben-Tal and Arkadi Nemirovski, "Robust Convex Optimization", vol 23:4, 769-805
3. M. R. Garey, D. S. Johnson, and Ravi Sethi, "The Complexity of Flowshop and Jobshop Scheduling", vol 1:2, 117-129
