= Arthur Iberall =

American physicist

Arthur S. Iberall
- Born: Arthur Saul Iberall; June 12, 1918; New York City, New York, U.S.
- Died: December 8, 2002 (aged 84); Irvine, California, U.S.
- Education: City College of New York (BS); George Washington University (MS)
- Known for: homeokinetics lines of non-extension
- Spouse(s): Helene Rubenstein (1940-2002; his death; 4 children)
- Scientific career
- Fields: Physics and complex systems
- Workplaces: National Bureau of Standards; University of California Los Angeles; Rand Development Corporation; General Technical Services

Arthur S. Iberall (June 12, 1918 – December 8, 2002) was an American physicist/hydrodynamicist and engineer who pioneered homeokinetics, the physics of complex, self-organizing systems. He was the originator of the concept of lines of non-extension on the human body which was used to create workable space suits.

== Biography ==
Arthur S. Iberall was born in New York City. His mother, Anna Katz, immigrated to the United States from Kaunas, Lithuania. His father, Benjamin Iberall, immigrated from Warsaw, Poland. He had one sibling, psychologist Rosalind Rothman. He married Helene Rubenstein (1913-2016) in 1940, and they had four daughters, Eleanora I. Robbins, Penni I. Rubin, Thea Iberall, and Valerie I. O'Connor.

Iberall studied at City College of New York, where he received a BS in physics in 1940 and then continued by studying mechanical engineering. From 1942-1945, he worked on an MS under George Gamow and Edward Teller at George Washington University.

From 1941 to 1953, Iberall worked at the National Bureau of Standards in Washington, DC. In 1953, he left government work and worked in the private sector at ARO (1954) and the Rand Development Corporation (1954-1964). In 1964, he started General Technical Services with Samuel Z. Cardon in Upper Darby Township, Pennsylvania. In 1976, he was awarded an honorary Doctor of Science from Ohio State University in recognition of his achievements in interdisciplinary scientific research. At the invitation of F. Eugene Yates, Iberall joined the UCLA Crump Institute for Medical Engineering. From 1981 to 1985, Iberall was a Crump Visiting Scholar where he did research and taught. In 1991, he retired and started publishing with Cri-de-Coeur Press.

Iberall died in 2002 from congestive heart failure.

== Work ==
Under the leadership of William G. Brombacher at the National Bureau of Standards, Iberall worked on instrument theory, safety equipment, and measurement problems such as the physics of the atmosphere. At that time, the US Navy and US Air Force were creating aircraft that could travel further and further into the upper atmosphere. Pilots were being affected at the higher altitudes, which led to funding of studies of human physiology in order to understand how the body responds to high G forces and reduced oxygen. He also worked on the development of a new breathing apparatus that led to undersea scuba innovations.

At the Rand Development Corporation, Iberall worked on engineering and physics problems. Along with chemist Samuel Z. Cardon, he solved technical problems for businesses such as Cleveland Pneumatic Tool Co. Westinghouse, Sherwin-Williams, Illinois Tool Works, Ohio Brass Co., and Industrial Fasteners Institute. They also worked on technical issues such as the analysis of waters of the US for the United States Department of Health, Education, and Welfare, engineering for military applications for the US Army and high altitude research and full pressure altitude suits for the USAF.

At General Technical Services, Iberall and Cardon solved problems such as physiological responses of mammals to high pressure and flow in arteries for NASA, water pollution for the Public Health Service. For US Army commands, they did research on oscillators, clothing design, technical forecasting, planning, systems science applications, cybernetics and computer applications, autonomous systems, and survival of complex systems. For the Office of Naval Research, they worked on inertial guidance systems, hydrodynamics equations, fluid dynamics. Other work included dosage radiation factors for the Atomic Energy Commission, systems science applications for the United States Department of Transportation, complex systems interactions for the National Institute of Aging, and mobile pressure suits for the US Air Force.

At the UCLA Crump Institute, Iberall joined the Complex Systems Group which attracted professors from many universities and federal agencies to learn how to incorporate systems science into diverse fields. He also taught courses on the thermodynamics of living systems for chemical engineering students, which was sponsored by the Marshak Colloquium of UCLA.

== Contributions ==
=== Space suits and lines of non-extension ===
In 1947, Iberall began work at NBS on pressure suits for the US Air Force and the National Advisory Committee for Aeronautics. They recognized that astronauts had to be protected from expansive forces. Iberall developed one of the first space suits to solve this problem; his first approximation was to use netting (linknet) to help the suit maintain form. The ultimate solution came from an analysis of the lines of non-extension (LONE), i.e. the parts of the body that did not move much so the suit did not need special treatment there. Astronaut Scott Crossfield flew the X-15 in this suit, as did astronauts on Gemini missions between 1962 and 1964. The federal government required that business interests take over further development and production for commercial applications, so the David Clark Company won the contract for space suit design and eventually took design in another direction. Years later, Dava Newman at Massachusetts Institute of Technology has her students following up on LONE as a design for the next generation of space suits.

The design of a space suit needed a deep understanding of physiology. As Iberall was studying this problem, his oldest daughter got polio and he went searching for the most innovative ideas to save the functioning of her afflicted leg. He found Rene Cailliet, a newly minted MD at the Kabat-Kaiser Institute who taught Iberall physiology. Later, as a professor of medicine at UCLA, Cailliet went on to become the author of the widely known series of textbooks on musculoskeletal medicine, and some of his earliest ideas thereby became incorporated into space suit design.

Iberall also learned physiology from his mentor, neurophysiologist and cybernetician Warren S. McCulloch. As they worked on biophysical research for the NASA exobiology program analyzing the dynamics of mammalian physiological processes, initial ideas that would become homeokinetics began to emerge. In 1967, they performed a complete systems analysis of the daily activities that constitute human behavior.

=== Homeokinetics—the physics of complex systems ===
Homeokinetics is the study of complex systems—universes, galaxies, social systems, people, or even systems that seem as simple as gases. The entire universe is modelled as atomistic-like units bound in interactive ensembles that form systems, level by level in a nested hierarchy. Homeokinetics treats all complex systems on an equal footing, both animate and inanimate, providing them with a common viewpoint. The complexity in studying how they work is reduced by the emergence of common languages for all complex systems.

Life, birth, and death of complex systems are bound in hierarchical processes that have both side-side and in-out components. In common with the simpler counterparts, complex systems exhibit rest phases, smooth or creeping flows, turbulence, and chaotic phases; they alternate in storminess and placidity, as well as in their intermittence and changeability.

While working at NBS on the problem of humans in high altitude space, Iberall was led into more and more interdisciplinary research using kinetic theory to develop instrumentation covering the major variables of pressure, temperature, density, and flow, both steady state and dynamically changing. Working on the applied problems of the aircraft industry, meteorology, and high altitude military led to his studies of high speed so-called speed-of-sound rates of flow, to more than one phase flow (e.g., gases and liquids), two or more stream flow theory, metastability, solid state metals research both for steady state loads and dynamic (or changing) states. This irrevocably led to the problem of turbulence as distinguished from laminar flow. That also led to the full Navier-Stokes equation set, a nonlinear high ordered mathematical physical construct that still leaves much to be desired in solution. From a homeokinetic perspective, these Navier-Stokes equations connect the lower level atomistic-like components with the upper level collective processes in the material-energetic substance.

It was through these interdisciplinary explorations that Iberall’s definition of complexity and its complexity measure began to emerge. Iberall and Harry Soodak realized they were observing an area that physics has neglected, that of complex systems with their very long internal factory day delays. These systems are associated with nested hierarchy and with an extensive range of time scale processes. It was such connections, referred to as both up-down or in-out connections (as nested hierarchy) and side-side or flatland physics among atomistic-like components (as heterarchy) that became the hallmark of homeokinetic problems. By 1975, they began to describe these the problems of nature, life, humankind, mind, and society.

A homeokinetic approach to complex systems has been applied to understanding life, ecological psychology, mind, anthropology, geology, law, motor control, bioenergetics, healing modalities, and political science.

It has also been applied to social physics where a homeokinetics analysis shows that one must account for flow variables such as the flow of energy, of materials, of action, reproduction rate, and value-in-exchange. Iberall's conjectures on life and mind have been used as a springboard to develop theories of mental activity and action.

== Congressional briefings ==
1960—Problems of Education and Science, US Senate Subcommittee on Government
1962—Scientific Needs of the USA, US Senate Subcommittee on Government
1963—Science as a Profession in the USA, US Senate Subcommittee on Government
1977—Scientific Needs of the USA, US Senate Subcommittee on Government

== Patents ==
- Iberall, A.S., Inertial sensing system for use in navigation and guidance, 1971 US patent 3559478
- Iberall, A.S., Adjustable helmet face mask, 1972 US patent 3658054
- Iberall, A.S., Blood pressure measuring mechanism, 1972 US patent 3704708

== Honors ==
- American Society for Cybernetics, past technical vice president
- Instrument Society of America, past committee member
- Biomedical Engineering Society, Alza Distinguished Lecturer (1975)
- International Society for the Comparative Study of Civilizations, past executive board member
- Fellow of the American Society of Mechanical Engineers
- Doctor of Science (honorary), Ohio State University (1976)
- Arthur S. Iberall Distinguished Lecture Series on Life and the Sciences of Complexity at University of Connecticut at Storrs (2003–present)

== Publications ==
Iberall authored 8 books, 95 peer-reviewed articles, and 49 scientific conference extended abstracts. He also wrote a series of booklets: "CP2" (Commentaries, Physical and Philosophical) published by Cri-de-Coeur Press from 1991-2002 discussing subjects as varied as problems with evolution, primer on social physics, and how systems and the mind work. A complete list of his published papers is online.

=== Books ===
- 1970. Iberall, Arthur S. (1970), Technical and Biological Problems of Control - A Cybernetic View, Pittsburgh, PA: Inst. Soc. of America, ISBN 978-0-876-64139-2
- 1972. Iberall, Arthur S. (1971), Toward a General Science of Viable Systems, New York: McGraw-Hill, ISBN 978-0-070-31672-0
- 1973. Iberall, Arthur S.; Schindler, A., Physics of Membrane Transport, Upper Darby, PA: General Technical Services, Inc.
- 1973. Iberall, Arthur S.; Cardon, Samuel Z.; Young, Ed, On Pulsatile and Steady Arterial Flow - The GTS Contribution, Upper Darby, PA: General Technical Services, Inc.
- 1974. Iberall, Arthur S., Bridges in Science - From Physics to Social Science, Upper Darby, PA: General Technical Services, Inc.
- 1976. Iberall, Arthur S. (1976), On Nature, Life, Mind, and Society, Upper Darby, PA: General Technical Services, Inc., ISBN 978-0-914-78004-5
- 1993. Iberall, Arthur S.; Wilkinson, David; White, Don (1993), Foundations for Social and Biological Evolution, Laguna Hills, CA: Cri-de-Coeur Press, ISBN 978-0-963-87990-5
- 2016. Iberall, Arthur S. (2016-09-30), Homeokinetics: The Basics, Medfield, MA: Strong Voices Publishing, ISBN 978-0-990-53614-7

=== Selected articles ===
- Iberall, A.S. (1964). "Control in biological systems - A physical review". Ann. N. Y. Acad. Sci. 117 (1): 445–515. Bibcode:1964NYASA.117..445I. doi:10.1111/j.1749-6632.1964.tb48202.x. PMID 14196660. S2CID 45727679.
- Iberall, A.S.; Cardon, S.Z. "Aeration mass-transfer related to Reynolds number". J. Appl. Chem. London. 16 (64): 1966.
- Iberall, A.S. "Anatomy and steady flow characteristics of the arterial system with an introduction to its pulsatile characteristics". J. Math. Biosci. 1 (375): 1967.
- Iberall, A.S.; McCulloch, W.S. (1967). "Behavioral model of man - His chains revealed". Currents in Modern Biology. 1 (337): 1968.
- Iberall, A.S. and W.S. McCulloch. "The organizing principle of complex living systems. J. Basic Engr., ASME 290-294, 1969.
- Iberall, A.S., Use of lines of non extension. ASME Publication, 1969.
- Iberall, A.S. "On the general dynamics of systems, General Systems Yearbook XV:7-13, 1970.
- Cardon, S.Z.; Iberall, A.S. (1970). "Oscillations in biological systems". Currents in Modern Biology. 3 (3): 237–249. Bibcode:1970BiSys...3..237C. doi:10.1016/0303-2647(70)90004-3. PMID 5457291.
- Iberall, A.S. (1970). "Regarding periodic phenomena". Science. 168 (3927): 152. Bibcode:1970Sci...168..152I. doi:10.1126/science.168.3927.152. PMID 17838986.
- Iberall, A.S. (1970). "The experimental design of a mobile pressure suit". Journal of Basic Engineering. 92 (2): 251–264. doi:10.1115/1.3424984.
- Iberall, A.S. (1972). "Blood flow and oxygen uptake in mammals". Annals of Biomedical Engineering. 1 (1): 1–8. doi:10.1007/bf02363413. PMID 4668691. S2CID 39983781.
- Iberall, A.S. (1972). "On a third-dimensional manifold of human mind - A speculation on its embodiment". Int. J. Psychobiol. 2 (3): 219–231.
- Iberall, A.S. A fantasia on the design of a mammal. In: A. Iberall, A. Guyton (eds.). Regulation and Control in Physiological Systems, ISA, Pittsburgh, 1973.
- Iberall, A.S. On the neurophysiological basis of war. General Systems Yearbook, XVIII: 161, 1973.
- Iberall, A., Guyton, A. (eds). Regulation and Control in Physiological Systems. Proc. Joint IFAC, Am. Physiol. Soc., Intern Union Physiol. Sci. Conference, Rochester, NY, Instru. Soc. Amer., Pittsburgh, 1973.
- Yates, F.E. and A.S. Iberall. Temporal and hierarchical organization in biosystems. In: J. Urquhart and F.E. Yates (eds.) Temporal Aspects of Therapeutics, p. 17-34 (54???), Plenum, N.Y., 1973.
- Schindler, A.M. and A.S. Iberall. The need for a kinetics for biological transport. Biophy. J. 13:804, 1973.
- Iberall, A.S. Flow and pressure regulation in the cardiovascular system. In: W. Vannah and H. Wayland (eds.). Flow, Its Measurement and Control In Science and Industry, Instr. Soc. of America, Pittsburgh, PA., 1(3), 1974.
- Iberall, A.S. On a thermodynamic theory of history. General Systems Yearbook XIX:201, 1974.
- Iberall, A.S. (1975). "On nature, man and society. A basis for scientific modeling". Ann. Biomed. Eng. 3 (4): 344–385. doi:10.1007/bf02409322. PMID 1221897. S2CID 13253609.
- Iberall, A.S. (1977). "A field and circuit thermodynamics for integrative physiology. I. Introduction to the general notions". Am. J. Physiol. 233 (5): R171–R180. doi:10.1152/ajpregu.1977.233.5.r171. PMID 920827.
- Llinas, R. R.; Iberall, A.S. (1977). "A global model of neuronal command-control systems". Biosystems. 8 (233): 233–5. Bibcode:1977BiSys...8..233L. doi:10.1016/0303-2647(77)90047-8. PMID 884222.
- Iberall, A.S.; Soodak, H.; Hassler, F. (1978). "A field and circuit thermodynamics for integrative physiology. II. Power and communicational spectroscopy in biology". Am. J. Physiol. 234 (1): R3–R19. doi:10.1152/ajpregu.1978.234.1.r3. PMID 623282.
- Iberall, A.S. (1978). "A field and circuit thermodynamics for integrative physiology. III. Keeping the books—a general experimental method". Am. J. Physiol. 234 (3): R85–R97. doi:10.1152/ajpregu.1978.234.3.r85. PMID 629372.
- Soodak, H.; Iberall, A.S. (1978). "Homeokinetics: A physical science for complex systems". Science. 201 (4356): 579–82. Bibcode:1978Sci...201..579S. doi:10.1126/science.201.4356.579. PMID 17794110. S2CID 19333503.
- Iberall, A.S.; Soodak, H. (1978). "Physical basis for complex systems—Some propositions relating levels of organization". Collective Phenomena. 3: 9–24.
- Iberall, A.S., H. Soodak and C. Arensberg. Homeokinetic physics of societies - A new discipline: Autonomous groups, cultures, polities. In: H. Reul, Ghista, D., and Rau, G. (eds.). Perspectives in Biomechanics, Vol. I, Part A. Harwood Academic Press, N.Y., pp. 433–527, 1980.
- Bloch, E.H.; Iberall, A.S. (1982). "Toward a concept of the functional unit of mammalian skeletal muscle. Invited opinion". Am. J. Physiol. 242 (5): R411–R420. doi:10.1152/ajpregu.1982.242.5.r411. PMID 7081463.
- Iberall, A.S. (1983). "What is "language" that can facilitate the flow of information? - a contribution to a fundamental theory of language and communication". J. Theor. Biol. 102 (3): 347–359. Bibcode:1983JThBi.102..347I. doi:10.1016/0022-5193(83)90373-9.
- Iberall, A.; Wilkinson, D. (1984). "Human sociogeophysics: Explaining the macroscopic patterns of man on earth—Phase I". GeoJournal. 8 (2): 171–9. doi:10.1007/bf00231495. S2CID 123073667.
- Iberall, A.; Wilkinson, D. (1984). "Human sociogeophysics—Phase II: The diffusion of human ethnicity by remixing". GeoJournal. 9 (4): 387–391. doi:10.1007/bf00697967. S2CID 189880589.
- Iberall, A (1984). "On the genesis of "is" and "ought". Am. J. Physiol. 246 (6): R937–R942. doi:10.1152/ajpregu.1984.246.6.r937. PMID 6742172.
- Iberall, A.; Wilkinson, D. (1985). "Human sociogeophysics - Phase II (cont'd): Criticality in the diffusion of ethnicity produces civil society". GeoJournal. 11 (2): 153–158. doi:10.1007/bf00212916. S2CID 154168961.
- Iberall, A (1985). "Outlining social physics for modern societies - locating culture, economics, and politics: The Enlightenment reconsidered". Proc. Natl. Acad. Sci. USA. 82 (5582–84): 5582–5584. Bibcode:1985PNAS...82.5582I. doi:10.1073/pnas.82.17.5582. PMC 390594. PMID 16593594.
- Wilkinson, D. and A. S. Iberall. "From systems physics to world politics: Invitation to an enterprise. In: M. Karns (ed.), Persistent Patterns and Emergent Structures in a Waning Century. Praeger, NY, 1986.
- Iberall, A. and Soodak, H.: A physics for complex systems. In: F. Yates, (ed.), Self-Organizing Systems, pp. 499–520. Plenum Press, NY 1987, p 499-520.
- Iberall, A. A physics for studies of civilizations. In: F.E. Yates, (ed.), Self-Organizing Systems: The Emergence of Order. New York: Plenum Press, 1987, p 521-540.
- Iberall, A.S. On rivers. In: F.E. Yates, (ed.), Self-Organizing Systems: The Emergence of Order. New York: Plenum Press, 1987, p 33-52.
- Soodak, H., Iberall, A. Thermodynamics and complex systems. In: F.E. Yates, (ed.). Self-Organizing Systems: The Emergence of Order. New York: Plenum Press, 1987, p 459-469.
- Iberall, A. and Wilkinson, D. Dynamic foundations for complex social systems. In: G. Modelski, (ed.), Exploring Long Cycles. Lynne Rienner Publishers, Boulder, CO 1987.
- Iberall, A.; White, D. (1988). "Evidence for a long term process scale for social change in modern man settled in place via agriculture and engaged in trade and war". GeoJournal. 17 (3): 311–338. Bibcode:1988GeoJo..17..311I. doi:10.1007/bf00181044. S2CID 16306706.
- Iberall, A (1988). "Possible correlation between species extinction, evolution, and plate adjustment to continental erosion". GeoJournal. 16 (2): 229–232. Bibcode:1988GeoJo..16..229I. doi:10.1007/bf02433017. S2CID 128937327.
- Iberall, A (1989). "How many species?". GeoJournal. 18 (2): 133–139. Bibcode:1989GeoJo..18..133I. doi:10.1007/bf01207087. S2CID 84136939.
- Iberall, A (1990). "A theoretical model for average river runoff". GeoJournal. 21 (3): 223–231. Bibcode:1990GeoJo..21..223I. doi:10.1007/bf02428507. S2CID 153512459.
- Iberall, A. How to run a society, CP2: Commentaries, Physical and Philosophic, Laguna Hills, CA, 1.1-1.4, 1990; 2.1-2.4, 1991.
- Iberall, A (1992). "Does intention have a characteristic fast scale?". Ecological Psychology. 4: 39–61. doi:10.1080/10407413.1992.10530792.
- Iberall, A (1995). "A characteristic 500-year process-time in cultural civilization". Comparative Civilizations Review. 32: 146–162.
- Iberall, A.; Hassler, F.; Soodak, H.; Wilkinson, D. (2000). "Invitation to an enterprise: From physics to world history to the study of civilizations". Comparative Civilizations Review. 42: 4–22.
- Iberall, A (2000). "What makes Sammy-Samantha and other mammals run? A first round of closure". Ecol. Psychol. 12 (2): 109–139. CiteSeerX 10.1.1.360.5583. doi:10.1207/s15326969eco1202_01. S2CID 18906970.
- Iberall, A.S. (2001). "The physics, chemical physics, and biological physics of the origin of life on earth". Ecol. Psychol. 13 (4): 315–327. CiteSeerX 10.1.1.189.5424. doi:10.1207/s15326969eco1304_03. S2CID 17811309.
