= Samuel Z. Cardon =

American chemist

- Born: November 24, 1918
- Died: December 28, 1996 (aged 78)
- Known for: Forecasting
- Scientific career
- Fields: Chemistry
- Workplaces: Rand Development Corporation; General Technical Services

Samuel Z. Cardon (November 24, 1918 – December 28, 1996) was a chemist and scientist entrepreneur who worked primarily for U.S. government agencies in need of technical forecasting.

== Biography ==
Samuel Cardon lived in Bratenahl, Ohio and was married to chemist Neva Lucille Campbell Cardon. They adopted two daughters, Lisa Cardon Tietze and Julie Cardon Bayko. Cardon worked at the Rand Development Corporation. In 1964, he started General Technical Services in Upper Darby Township, Pennsylvania with Arthur Iberall. Cardon died in 1996.

== Work ==
Cardon published numerous reports with Arthur Iberall for U.S. government agencies in need of chemical and physical modelling including analysis of waters of the US for the United States Department of Health, Education, and Welfare, water pollution for the Public Health Service, space suit related clothing designs for the United States Army. They also did technical forecasting, cybernetics, application of systems science, social physics, autonomous systems designs, computer modeling for strategic needs. For NASA, they worked on the general dynamics of human and other mammalian systems, and thermodynamic issues in long space voyages. For the United States Department of Commerce, they worked on internal human responses. For the United States Department of Transportation, they did systems models for transportation planning, urban systems functions, and modelling trade. Together, they solved technical problems for businesses such as Cleveland Pneumatic Tool Co., Westinghouse, Sherwin-Williams, Illinois Tool Works, Ohio Brass Co., and Industrial Fasteners Institute.

== Honors ==
President of the American Association of Small Research Companies

== Patents ==
- Production of fluoroacetonitrile, (1948).
- Manufacture of 3-chlorocoumarin, (1949).
- Screen oil, (1950).

== Publications ==
=== Books ===
- 1973. Iberall, Arthur S.; Cardon, Samuel Z.; Young, Ed, On Pulsatile and Steady Arterial Flow - The GTS Contribution., Upper Darby, PA: General Technical Services, Inc.

=== Conference proceedings ===
- Lefemine, D. V., E. T. Alvord, and S. Z. Cardon. "Identification of 3, 4-benzpyrene in cigarette paper smoke and tars; Southeastern Reg. Mtg., Am. Chem. Soc., Birmingham, AL, 504913137-3140, 1954.
- Alvord, E. T. and S. Z. Cardon. Separation and identification of 3, 4-benzpyrene in cigarette smoke; 9th Tobacco Chemists’ Research Conference. Program Booklet and Abstracts 9, Part 2: 5, 1955.
- Cardon, S. Z. and E. T. Alvord. The presence of 3, 4-benzpyrene in cigarette smoke. Ann. Mtg., Am. Assoc. Adv. Sci., 1-12, 1955.
- Iberall, A.S. and S.Z. Cardon. Regulation and control in biological systems. In: K. Kaneshige and C. Izawa (eds), Proceedings of IFAC Tokyo Symposium on Sys. Engr. for Control Sys. Design, Tokyo: Science Council of Japan, 1965.
- Ehrenberg, M. and S. Cardon. Dynamics of the microcirculation. Proc. Ann. Conf. Engr. Med. Bio., 8:50, 1966.
- Young, E., A.S. Iberall, M. Ehrenberg and S.Z. Cardon. Proc. Ann. Conf. Engr. Med. Bio., 8, 1966.
- Iberall, A.S. and S.Z. Cardon. Hierarchical regulation in the complex biological organism. Record of the IEEE Systems Science and Cybernetics Conference, 1969.
- Cardon, S.Z., Survival and growth (II): the small R & D firm. Proc. Conference on Small Research and Development Firms. Los Angeles, California, 1972. (Washington: Small Business Administration, Office of Procurement Assistance; for sale by the Supt. of Docs., U.S. Govt. Print. Off., 1973).

=== Selected articles ===
- Brown, H.C., H.I. Schlesinger and S.Z. Cardon, Studies in Stereochemistry. I. Steric strains as a factor in the relative stability of some coordination compounds of boron. J. Am. Chem. Soc., 64(2):325, 1942. https://dx.doi.org/10.1031/ja01254a031
- Cardon, S.Z. and Lankelma, The acyloin condensation of 2-Thiophonealdehyde. J.A. Chem. Soc, 70(12):4248, 1948. https://dx.doi.org/10.1021/ja01192a503
- Alvord, E.T. and S.Z. Cardon, The inhibition of formation of 3, 4-benzpyrene in cigarette smoke. Br. J. Cancer, 10(3):498-503, 1956.
- Alvord, E.T., S.Z. Cardon, R. Hitchcock and H.J. Rand. 3, 4-Benzpyrene in the smoke of cigarette paper, tobacco, and cigarettes. Br. J. Cancer, 10(3):485-97, 1956.
- Rand, H.J., S.Z. Cardon, E.T. Alvord and A. Burhan, A study of cigarette smoke and cigarette paper smoke alone. Am. J. Surg, 94(3):438-43, 1957.
- Cardon, S. Z. 3, 4-Benzpyrene in cigarette smoke. Tob. Sci 2:130-131, 1958.
- Meinhardt, N. A., SAMUEL Z. CARDON, and P. W. Vogel. Novel Method for the Preparation of O, O-Dialkyl Phosphorochloridothionates1. J. Org. Chem. 25.11: 1991-1992, 1960. https://dx.doi.org/10.1021/jo01081a043
- Iberall, A.S. and S.Z. Cardon. Control in biological systems—A physical review. Ann. N.Y. Acad. Sci., 117:445-518, 1964. https://dx.doi.org/10.1111/j.1749-6632.1964.tb48202.x
- Iberall, A.S. and S.Z. Cardon. Aeration mass-transfer related to Reynolds number. J. Appl. Chem. London, 16:64, 1966.
- Iberall, A. S. and S. Z. Cardon. Metabolic control in the mammalian microcirculation. In: P. H. Hammond (ed.), Theory of Self-Adaptive Control Systems. Springer, N.Y., 64-69, 1966.
- Iberall, A.S., M. Ehrenberg, S. Cardon and M. Simenhoff. High frequency blood glucose oscillations in man. Metabolism, 19:1119, 1968.
- Cardon, S.Z. and A.S. Iberall. Oscillations in biological systems. Currents in Modern Bio. 3:237-249, 1970. https://dx.doi.org/10.1016/0303-2647(70)90004-3
- Cardon, S., C. Ostermeyer and E. Bloch. Effect of oxygen on cyclic red blood cell flow in unanesthetized mammalian striated muscle as determined by spectroscopy. Microvas. Res., 2:67, 1970.
