= Thomas M. Liggett =

American mathematician (1944–2020)

Thomas Milton Liggett
- Born: March 29, 1944; Danville, Kentucky, U.S.
- Died: May 12, 2020 (aged 76); Los Angeles, California, U.S.
- Education: Oberlin College (BA); Stanford University (MS, PhD)
- Spouse: Christina Marie Goodale (m. 1972)
- Children: 2
- Scientific career
- Workplaces: UCLA
- Thesis: Weak Convergence of Conditioned Sums of Independent Random Vectors (1969)
- Doctoral advisor: Samuel Karlin
- Doctoral students: Norman Matloff; Amber L. Puha

Thomas Milton Liggett (March 29, 1944 – May 12, 2020) was a mathematician at the University of California, Los Angeles. He worked in probability theory, specializing in interacting particle systems.

== Early life ==
Thomas Milton Liggett was born on March 29, 1944, in Danville, Kentucky. Liggett moved at the age of two with his missionary parents to Latin America, where he was educated in Bueno Aires, Argentina and San Juan, Puerto Rico. He graduated from Oberlin College with a Bachelor of Arts in 1965, where he was influenced towards probability by Samuel Goldberg (b. 1925), an ex-student of William Feller. He moved to Stanford, taking classes with Kai Lai Chung, and writing his thesis, Weak Convergence of Conditioned Sums of Independent Random Vectors, in 1969 with advisor Samuel Karlin on problems associated with the invariance principle. He graduated with a Master of Science in 1966 and a Doctor of Philosophy in 1969.

== Career ==
Liggett joined the faculty at UCLA in 1969, where he spent his entire career. He became a professor in the mathematics department in 1976, and served as department chair from 1991 to 1994. He retired in 2011, but remained active within the department. He was the advisor of Norman Matloff and Amber L. Puha.

Liggett had contributed to numerous areas of probability theory, including subadditive ergodic theory, random graphs, renewal theory, and was best known for his pioneering work on interacting particle systems, including the contact process, the voter model, and the exclusion process. His two books in this field have been influential.

Liggett was the managing editor of the Annals of Probability from 1985–1987. He held a Sloan Research Fellowship from 1973–1977, and a Guggenheim Fellowship from 1997–1998. He was the Wald Memorial Lecturer of the Institute of Mathematical Statistics in 1996, and was elected to the National Academy of Sciences in 2008. He had been elected to the American Academy of Arts & Sciences in 2012, and in 2012 he also became a fellow of the American Mathematical Society.

== Personal life ==
Liggett married Christina Marie Goodale on August 19, 1972. They had two children, Timothy and Amy. Liggett died on May 12, 2020, in Los Angeles.
