= Eleanora Robbins =

American geologist and science educator (born 1942)

- In 2023
- Born: Eleanora Roberta Iberall; 1942 (age 83–84); Washington, D.C., U.S.
- Education: Ohio State University (BS); University of Arizona (MS); Pennsylvania State University (PhD)
- Known for: Palynology of ore deposits; microbial iron oxidation; outdoor science education on tribal lands
- Scientific career
- Fields: Palynology, geomicrobiology, economic geology
- Workplaces: United States Geological Survey; San Diego State University

Eleanora Iberall Robbins (née Eleanora Roberta Iberall; born 1942), known as Norrie Robbins, is an American geologist. Robbins served in the Peace Corps in Tanzania from 1964 to 1966, where she was the first female field geologist with the Geological Survey of Tanzania. She then worked as a research geologist for the United States Geological Survey (USGS) from 1967 to 2001 and was an adjunct faculty member at San Diego State University from 2001 to 2015. Robbins specialised in palynology and later geomicrobiology. She holds a patent, with Motoaki Sato, for an ozonation method of recovering metals from waste water. After retiring she taught outdoor science to children on reservations in San Diego County, for which she won a Leadership Award in 2023.

== Early life and education ==
Robbins was born Eleanora Roberta Iberall in Washington, D.C., in 1942. Her father was the physicist Arthur S. Iberall. The family moved to Cleveland Heights, Ohio, in 1952. Robins obtained a bachelor of science degree in geology from Ohio State University in 1964, an master of science degree in geology and palynology from the University of Arizona in 1972, and a Ph.D in geosciences from Penn State University in 1982.

Her master's research concerned an extinct mountain goat that had lived in the Grand Canyon.

== Peace Corps service in Tanzania ==
Robbins joined the Peace Corps after graduating in 1964 and was assigned to the Geological Survey of Tanganyika, later Tanzania, at Dodoma. She was the survey's first female field geologist. Her work there involved plotting geochemical survey data onto maps for use by exploration teams. She has said that during a leave in 1965 she mapped boundaries at the Olorgesailie prehistoric site in Kenya.

== United States Geological Survey ==
Robbins joined the USGS in 1967 and remained until 2001, working in Washington, D.C., Denver and Reston, Virginia. Her early assignments covered titanium and rare-earth element deposits, petroleum exploration on the Atlantic Outer Continental Shelf, and fuel and mineral deposits of the Triassic Newark rift system.

=== Palynology ===
Palynology was Robbins's principal analytical tool. She used a rock-processing method that omitted the centrifugation step in standard preparations, on the grounds that it destroyed fragile organic structures such as fecal pellets.

With Karen Porter and Kurt Haberyan she reported pellet microfossils from Early Proterozoic rocks, which the authors argued was possible evidence for metazoan life at that date. The Atlanta Journal reported the finding in November 1985. In 1992 the German news magazine Der Spiegel cited the finding in a feature on the origin of animal life, noting that the dating of the rocks was disputed. An earlier paper with Porter linked zooplankton fecal pellets to the formation of fossil fuel and phosphate deposits.

Robbins co-authored the monograph Petrolipalynology with Jiang Dexin, Wang Yongdong and Yang Huiqiu, published by Springer in 2016, which sets out methods for identifying petroleum source rocks from fossil spores and pollen.

=== Geomicrobiology ===
From the 1980s Robbins worked increasingly on microbial processes in mineral systems. She studied acid mine drainage and its remediation, including the chemistry of anoxic limestone drains and the microbial communities of extremely acidic waters at Iron Mountain, California. She published a morphological key for identifying bacteria and archaea in acidic environments.

This work extended to ancient iron deposits and the question of whether mineral forms resembling bacteria are genuine fossils. Robbins described iron-coated microstructures from the Isua iron formation of south-western Greenland, and in a paper with her father proposed that hollow iron-oxide rods could serve as a search image for former life in samples returned from Mars.

Robbins studied the corrosion of the wreck of the SS Central America, a steamship that sank off North Carolina in 1857 and lies at a depth of 2,200 metres. Working with the scientists of the recovery expedition, she examined the rusticles that had formed on the ship's ironwork and tentatively identified the bacteria building them as the iron oxidizers Leptothrix and Siderocapsa. In October 1991, at the USGS laboratories in Reston, she sealed iron and sterilized seawater in vials and added rusticle material from the wreck to half of them; iron-oxidizing bacteria colonized those vials and not the controls. A rusticle from the RMS Titanic, tested in the same way in 1992, gave the same result. The expedition's report concluded that iron-oxidizing bacteria, rather than the sulfate-reducing bacteria that had been proposed for the Titanic, appeared to be the dominant agents of rusticle formation in the deep ocean.

To obtain a modern analogue for Precambrian iron formation, Robbins organised the JIMES expedition to the iron-rich bays of Santorini in Greece, working with Chrysoula Kourtidou-Papadeli of Aristotle University of Thessaloniki and a group of local secondary-school students who collected samples over about eighteen months.

After retiring from teaching she continued fieldwork on the microbial geochemistry of the San Diego River watershed.

== Science education ==
Robbins began running outdoor science programmes for children while at the USGS. From 1989 to 1998 she ran a summer programme called "What's Under Your Feet?" for children in the Anacostia area of Washington, D.C. The USGS subsequently published a children's activity book of the same title, written by Robbins with Penni Rubin.

Alongside her wetlands and acid-mine-drainage fieldwork she ran short science programmes for Shawnee children in Ohio, Ojibwe participants from the Bad River reservation in Wisconsin, and the children of coal miners in Ohio, Pennsylvania and West Virginia. In April 1996, while she was conducting research in the Swatara Creek watershed in Pennsylvania, elementary pupils at Pine Grove brought her water samples from the creek's headwaters and tested them with her. In 1998 she enlisted an Advanced Placement biology class at Windber High School, Pennsylvania, to make a biological inventory of a mine-drainage reclamation site on a tributary of Dark Shade Creek, where manganese was being removed from the water. She also ran programmes for Chickahominy children in Virginia and Piscataway children in Maryland.

After moving to California in 2001 she founded the Science Explorers Club, which she ran on reservations in San Diego County, taking Kumeyaay, Luiseño, Cupeño and Cahuilla children onto their own land to study local geology and ecology. Writing in 2024, April Nurse described the club as having run for twenty-three years across twelve tribal communities and reaching about a thousand children. With Riggs and Darner she published on approaches to recruiting Native American students into the geosciences.

In 2012 Robbins searched Balboa Park for the site of the Kumeyaay village of the chief Hatam, on the reasoning that the village would have stood on running water. She located the creek, by then buried in an open culvert behind a city maintenance yard, its course still marked by willows, and matched its position to accounts of the village. Voice of San Diego reported the search, quoting her: "Being a geologist, I drove around and around looking for the river, because a village requires a river."

== Awards and honours ==
- Listed in American Men & Women of Science in the 19th edition (1995/96), 20th edition (1998/99), 21st edition (2003) and 22nd edition (2005).
- Inducted, with other members of her family, into the Youth on the Move International Educators' Hall of Fame, 2015. The San Diego Union-Tribune reported the induction and photographed her tutoring children at the Barona Reservation.
- Climate Adaptation Leadership Award, Climate Science Alliance, 2023, for her work with tribal youth at Pala and intertribally.

== Selected publications ==
- Porter, K. G.; Robbins, E. I. (1981). "Zooplankton fecal pellets link fossil fuel and phosphate deposits". Science 212: 931–933.
- Robbins, E. I.; Porter, K. G.; Haberyan, K. A. (1985). "Pellet microfossils: possible evidence for metazoan life in Early Proterozoic time". Proceedings of the National Academy of Sciences 82: 5809–5813.
- Robbins, E. I. (2000). "Bacteria and Archaea in acidic environments and a key to morphological identification". Hydrobiologia 433: 61–89.
- Jiang, D.; Robbins, E. I.; Wang, Y.; Yang, H. (2016). Petrolipalynology. Springer.
