= USDF =

USDF may refer to:

- United States Dressage Federation
- USDF model (United we stand, divided we fall), from econophysics
- Umbutfo Swaziland Defense Force, the Military of Swaziland
- Utah State Defense Force, active during World War II
- United Student Democratic Federation, Indian leftist student association

== See also ==
- "United we stand, divided we fall", a motto
