= Danielle Wood =

Danielle Wood may refer to:

- Danielle Wood (writer) (born 1972), Australian writer, journalist and academic
- Danielle Wood (economist), Australian economist and incoming chair of the Productivity Commission
- Danielle Wood (engineer), American engineer and assistant professor in the MIT Media Lab
