= Lines of non-extension =

In the field of biomechanics, the lines of non-extension are notional lines running across the human body along which body movement causes neither stretching or contraction. Discovered by Arthur Iberall in work beginning in the 1940s, as part of research into space suit design, they have been further developed by Dava Newman in the development of the Space Activity Suit.

They were originally mapped by Iberall by drawing a series of circles, similar to Tissot indicatrices, over a portion of the body and then watching their deformations as the wearer walked around or performed various tasks. The circles deform into ellipses as the skin stretches over the moving musculature, and these deformations were recorded. After a huge number of such measurements the data is then examined to find all of the possible deformations of the circles, and more importantly, the non-moving points on them where the original circle and the deformed ellipse intersect (at four points per circle). By mapping these points over the entire body, a series of lines are produced.

These lines may then be used to direct the placement of tension elements in a spacesuit to enable constant suit pressure regardless of the motion of the body.
