= Mechanical counterpressure suit =

Spacesuit providing mechanical pressure using elastic garments

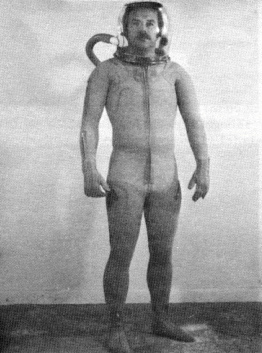
The Space Activity Suit developed by Paul Webb and built under a NASA project. The image shows the complete multi-layer suit and positive-pressure helmet, lacking only the backpack. (taken c. 1971)

A mechanical counterpressure (MCP) suit, partial pressure suit, direct compression suit, or space activity suit (SAS) is an experimental spacesuit which applies stable pressure against the skin by means of skintight elastic garments. The SAS is not inflated like a conventional spacesuit: it uses mechanical pressure, rather than air pressure, to compress the human body in low-pressure environments. Development was begun by NASA and the Air Force in the late 1950s and then again in the late 1960s, but neither design was used. Research is under way at the Massachusetts Institute of Technology (MIT) on a "Bio-Suit" System which is based on the original SAS concept.

== Background ==
The human body can briefly survive exposure to the hard vacuum of space unprotected, despite contrary depictions in some popular science fiction. Human skin does not need to be protected from vacuum and is gas-tight by itself. Human flesh expands to about twice its size in such conditions, giving the visual effect of a body builder rather than an overfilled balloon. This can be counteracted through mechanical counter-pressure from a suitably designed garment. Consciousness is retained for up to 15 seconds as the effects of oxygen starvation set in. Counteracting this requires a helmet to contain breathing gases and protect the ears and eyes. These effects have been confirmed through various accidents in very high altitude conditions, outer space, and training vacuum chambers.

== Cooling ==
Cooling of the astronaut with an SAS is generally achieved with evaporation from body perspiration which is emitted from the suit in all directions. Water, salts, and proteins can deposit on optics and other sensitive surfaces causing damage or degradation. This can limit the usefulness of an SAS. For the inflated spacesuits used on the Space Shuttle, International Space Station, and the Apollo program, cooling was achieved in the Primary Life Support System by sublimation of water in a vacuum.

== Designs ==
=== Mauch ===
In 1959 Hans Mauch was working on "breathable" undergarments for the Mercury space suit when he came up with the idea of a way to build a mechanical counterpressure design. The Mauch team noticed that closed-cell foams, which trap gas within their structure, expand when outside pressure is lowered. By containing the foam within a non-expanding outer layer, it would place increasing pressure on the body as the pressure lowered. This appeared to allow for a design that would offer far better mobility than the almost-rigid Mercury design.

Late in 1959 Mauch Laboratories was granted a contract by the US Air Force to develop a working model, as part of the Air Force's secret X-20 Dynasoar efforts. The program ran until 1962, during which time NASA had joined the effort. The suit was built with a layer of foam sandwiched between two layers of fabric, the inner against the wearer's skin (or undergarments) to provide mechanical support, and the outer providing containment. A separate, and bulky, helmet provided pressure and breathing gases. Like the undergarments that Mauch was developing for Mercury, thermal control was provided by direct sweat transpiration through the fabric. The resulting suit was about as bulky as the original Mercury design, excluding the large helmet.

Extended vacuum testing was carried out successfully, but the suit proved to have less mobility than expected and further development was dropped.

=== Webb ===
The introduction of improved fabrics led to Paul Webb's concept for a new way to build an SAS. Further work was contracted in order to test various design concepts. Between 1968 and 1971 ten designs of increasing sophistication were built, leading eventually to a series of successful tests in vacuum chambers. The longest test was two hours and forty-five minutes.

The tests were successful: the practicality of a mechanical counter pressure spacesuit was demonstrated conclusively. The energy needed to move about was considerably less than conventional designs, which was a major improvement for long-duration spacewalks. Tests of punctures showed that up to a square millimeter of skin could be directly exposed to vacuum for extended periods with no permanent effect. A similar puncture in a conventional suit would result in a loss of pressure and breathing air. It weighed half as much as the primary pressure suit worn by NASA astronauts for Project Apollo, the A7L.

A number of problems also turned up, primarily related to the problem of keeping the suit in strong mechanical contact at every point on the body. Concavities or small folds in the fabric could lead to fluid pooling in the gaps; the groin area proved extremely difficult to tailor successfully. To correct this, small pads of polyurethane foam were inserted into concavities and were successful in most problem areas. The suits had to be tailored to each individual, although the same was true of all space suits of the era. The largest difficulty was donning and removing the suit. In order to effectively provide the minimum pressure of 0.3 bars (4.4 psi) necessary for human physiology, the suit had to be extremely tight-fitting, making donning and doffing a highly strenuous task.

In 1971, Webb, along with James F. Annis, published their findings in a report. The report remained positive, and the researchers felt that further improvements were possible. Quoting the Report:

In conclusion, the SAS at its present stage of development will protect man from the effects of the vacuum environment, in a garment, which permits improved mobility and natural body movements. Physiologically the approach is sound, and although there remain many problems to be solved, they are principally mechanical in nature. It has been suggested that solution of the mechanical problems, combined with careful tailoring based upon biomechanical analysis, plus the development of specific elastic fabrics, could eventually lead to a space qualified version of the SAS.

The original SAS design was based on two new fabrics: a type of "powernet" (or "girdle fabric") for high-tension areas, and an elastic bobbinet weave for lower-tension areas. Both were based on a heavy elastic warp thread with a much less elastic weft thread to form a netting. The terms warp and weft are used loosely here, as the material was not woven using traditional means. Powernet used Spandex cord as the warp with nylon cord as the weft, allowing movement primarily along the warp axis. Bobbinet used cotton-wrapped rubber warp and nylon or Dacron weft, and was flexible in both directions. The cotton wrapping limited the maximum stretch to 200% of the rest length. The amount of over-pressure bobbinet could create was about 0.02 bars (0.29 psi) over the torso, the largest volume, and up to 0.053 bars (0.77 psi) over smaller radius curves on the wrist and ankles. Powernet could produce about 0.067 bars (0.97 psi) even on the torso. A minimum of 0.17 bars (2.5 psi) is needed for normal breathing.

Multiple layers and patches of the two materials were used to control the overall mechanical pressure around the body. Starting at the skin, a "slip layer" of light powernet was used to allow the outer layers to slide over the skin without binding. Under this layer a number of foam pads were placed on various concavities on the body to keep them in contact with the suit. On top of this was the counter-pressure bladder, part of the breathing system. On top of this were up to six additional layers of powernet over the trunk with bobbinet arms and legs, or all-bobbinet garments covering the trunk only. The garments were put on like a normal bodysuit with a large zipper closing the front, with additional drawstrings at some points to help close the garment. Zippers on alternating layers were offset.

The positive-pressure breathing system consisted of three main portions: the pressurized helmet, the breathing bladder, and the tankage system in a backpack. The bladder and helmet were connected together to pump air out of the bladder and over the torso when the user breathed in, reducing the amount of pressure on the user's chest. The helmet was secured by means of a non-elastic garment of Nomex cloth which wrapped around the chest and under the arms, and by the elastic layers above and below it.

=== MIT Bio-Suit ===
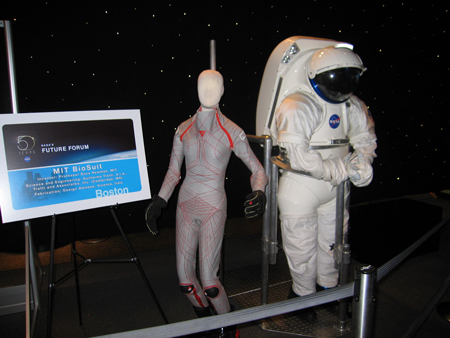
MIT Bio Suit next to the Mars Mark III planetary hard suit

The Bio-Suit is an experimental space activity suit under construction at the Massachusetts Institute of Technology at the direction of professor Dava Newman, with support from the NASA Institute for Advanced Concepts. Similar to the SAS in concept, the BioSuit applies advances in engineering and measurement to produce a simplified version of the SAS design.

Newman has worked extensively in biomechanics, especially in the field of computerized measurement of human movement. As with gas-filled suits, Newman has used the principle of "lines of non-extension", a concept originated by Arthur Iberall in work dating back to the late 1940s, to place the tension elements along lines of the body where the skin does not stretch during most normal movements.

The primary structure of the BioSuit is built by placing elastic cords along the lines of non-extension. Thus, whatever pressure they provide will be constant even as the wearer moves. In this way, they can control the mechanical counter-pressure the suit applies. The rest of the suit is then built up from spandex lying between the primary pressure cords. As of 2005, the Bio-Suit team had constructed at least three lower leg prototypes using different materials, including nylon-spandex, elastic, and urethane-painted foam. In one experimental design, kevlar fabric was used between cords for areas where the expansion was limited. At least one full-body suit has been constructed for Newman, which she has worn for numerous photo-ops; it is unknown if the entire suit meets the same counter-pressure standards that the lower-leg prototypes were designed for. Each suit has to be custom tailored for the wearer, but the complexity of this task is reduced through the use of whole-body laser scans.

The result is a one-layer version of the SAS; it is lighter than the original and more flexible, allowing more natural motion and decreasing the energy cost of motion. Versions of portions of the BioSuit have consistently reached 0.25 bars (3.6 psi), and the team is currently aiming for 0.3 bars (4.4 psi). As mechanical counter-pressure has proven difficult for small joints such as those in the hands, the BioSuit baseline design uses gas-filled gloves and boots, in addition to a gas-filled helmet.

A later variant of the biosuit employs heat-activated shape-memory alloy (SMA) coils. In this design the suit fits loosely on the body when initially donned. When a power module is attached, the spring-like coils in the suit contract to form-fit the suit to the body. The design of the coil was further defined in an article in the journal IEEE/ASME: Transactions on Mechatronics. As of 2008, the Biosuit reportedly had the potential to be ready for use in Mars missions in the near future.

As of 2019, an additional improvement has been made with the addition of nucleated boron tubes, which can shield the wearer of the suit from the radiation present in space and on the surfaces of the Moon and Mars. According to Cathy Lewis of the National Air and Space Museum, "It may not be the next suit, but it will be one of the subsequent suits", indicating that development remains active and focused on future Moon and Mars missions.

== See also ==
- Single-person spacecraft
