= Amber L. Puha =

American mathematician

- Born: United States
- Citizenship: United States
- Education: University of California, Los Angeles (Ph.D., M.A.); University of California, San Diego (B.A.)
- Scientific career
- Fields: Probability theory Stochastic process Queueing theory
- Workplaces: California State University San Marcos
- Thesis: A Reversible Interacting Particle System on the Homogeneous Tree (1998)
- Doctoral advisor: Thomas M. Liggett

Amber Lynn Puha is an American mathematician and educator at California State University San Marcos. Her research concerns probability theory and stochastic processes.

== Early life and education ==
She earned a B.A. in mathematics at University of California, San Diego (UCSD) in 1993 and a Ph.D. in mathematics at University of California, Los Angeles (UCLA) under the supervision of Thomas M. Liggett in 1998.

== Career ==
She joined California State University San Marcos (CSUSM) in 1999. She was appointed an associate professor in 2005 and a full professor in 2010. She has been the chair of the Department of Mathematics at CSUSM since 2021.

Her research has been focused on the modeling and analysis of stochastic networks. Jointly with H. Christian Gromoll and Ruth J. Williams, she developed fluid (law of large numbers) and diffusion (central limit theorem) approximations for processor sharing queues with renewal arrivals and iid service requirements. By removing the Poisson arrival and the exponential service assumptions in previous literatures, this work advanced the state of art of applied probability and has board applications, "from many-server parallel queues that model call centers to bandwidth sharing communications networks that model the Internet."

=== Professional services ===
From 2009 to 2011, she served as an associate director at the Institute for Pure and Applied Mathematics, a federally funded mathematics research institute on the UCLA campus. From 2013 to 2015, she served a three-year elected term on the American Mathematical Society Council, the main governing body of the society. From 2016 to 2019, she served on the INFORMS Applied Probability Society Prize Committee. From 2017 to 2020, she served on the Committee On Travel Awards of the Institute for Mathematical Statistics. Since 2013, she has been the coordinator of The Southern California Probability Symposium, an annual gathering of probabilists supported by University of California, Irvine, UCLA, UCSB, UCSD, and University of Southern California.

Since 2019, she has been an associate editor of Mathematics of Operations Research in the area of stochastic models.

From 2013-2015, Puha served as a Council Member at Large for the American Mathematical Society. Since 2016, she has been a life member at American Mathematical Society.

=== Other services ===
In addition to her academic work, she served as the faculty advisor for the CSUSM Surf Team, which competes in the National Scholastic Surfing Association (NSSA). She led the team to its first and second National Championship in 2009 and 2019, respectively. She won the NSSA Coach of the Year award in 2019.

== Awards ==
- INFORMS Applied Probability Society Best Publication Award (2007), jointly with H. Christian Gromoll and Ruth J. Williams
- Greater San Diego Area Mathematics Council Outstanding Post Secondary Mathematics Teacher (2009)
- CSUSM Presidents Outstanding Faculty Award for Scholarship and Creative Activity (2015/2016)
- National Scholastic Surfing Association Coach of the Year (2019)
