= Interacting particle system =

Type of stochastic process

In probability theory, an interacting particle system (IPS) is a stochastic process $(X(t))_{t \in \mathbb R^+}$ on some configuration space $\Omega= S^G$ given by a site space, a countably-infinite-order graph $G$ and a local state space, a compact metric space $S$. More precisely IPS are continuous-time Markov jump processes describing the collective behavior of stochastically interacting components. IPS are the continuous-time analogue of stochastic cellular automata.

Among the main examples are the voter model, the contact process, the asymmetric simple exclusion process (ASEP), the Glauber dynamics and in particular the stochastic Ising model.

IPS are usually defined via their Markov generator giving rise to a unique Markov process using Markov semigroups and the Hille-Yosida theorem. The generator again is given via so-called transition rates $c_\Lambda(\eta,\xi)>0$ where $\Lambda\subset G$ is a finite set of sites and $\eta,\xi\in\Omega$ with $\eta_i=\xi_i$ for all $i\notin\Lambda$. The rates describe exponential waiting times of the process to jump from configuration $\eta$ into configuration $\xi$. More generally the transition rates are given in form of a finite measure $c_\Lambda(\eta,d\xi)$ on $S^\Lambda$.

The generator $L$ of an IPS has the following form. First, the domain of $L$ is a subset of the space of "observables", that is, the set of real valued continuous functions on the configuration space $\Omega$. Then for any observable $f$ in the domain of $L$, one has

$Lf(\eta)=\sum_\Lambda\int_{\xi:\xi_{\Lambda^c}=\eta_{\Lambda^c}}c_\Lambda(\eta,d\xi)[f(\xi)-f(\eta)]$.

For example, for the stochastic Ising model we have $G=\mathbb Z^d$, $S=\{-1,+1\}$, $c_\Lambda=0$ if $\Lambda\neq\{i\}$ for some $i\in G$ and

$$c_i(\eta,\eta^i)=\exp[-\beta\sum_{j:|j-i|=1}\eta_i\eta_j]$$

where $\eta^i$ is the configuration equal to $\eta$ except it is flipped at site $i$. $\beta$ is a new parameter modeling the inverse temperature.

== The Voter model ==
The voter model (usually in continuous time, but there are discrete versions as well) is a process similar to the contact process. In this process $\eta(x)$ is taken to represent a voter's attitude on a particular topic. Voters reconsider their opinions at times distributed according to independent exponential random variables (this gives a Poisson process locally – note that there are in general infinitely many voters so no global Poisson process can be used). At times of reconsideration, a voter chooses one neighbor uniformly from amongst all neighbors and takes that neighbor's opinion. One can generalize the process by allowing the picking of neighbors to be something other than uniform.

=== Discrete time process ===
In the discrete time voter model in one dimension, $\xi_t(x): \mathbb{Z} \to \{0,1\}$ represents the state of particle $x$ at time $t$. Informally each individual is arranged on a line and can "see" other individuals that are within a radius, $r$. If more than a certain proportion, $\theta$ of these people disagree then the individual changes her attitude, otherwise she keeps it the same. Durrett and Steif (1993) and Steif (1994) show that for large radii there is a critical value $\theta_c$ such that if $\theta > \theta_c$ most individuals never change, and for $\theta \in (1/2, \theta_c)$ in the limit most sites agree. (Both of these results assume the probability of $\xi_0(x) = 1$ is one half.)

This process has a natural generalization to more dimensions, some results for this are discussed in Durrett and Steif (1993).

=== Continuous time process ===
The continuous time process is similar in that it imagines each individual has a belief at a time and changes it based on the attitudes of its neighbors. The process is described informally by Liggett (1985, 226), "Periodically (i.e., at independent exponential times), an individual reassesses his view in a rather simple way: he chooses a 'friend' at random with certain probabilities and adopts his position." A model was constructed with this interpretation by Holley and Liggett (1975).

This process is equivalent to a process first suggested by Clifford and Sudbury (1973) where animals are in conflict over territory and are equally matched. A site is selected to be invaded by a neighbor at a given time.
