= Voter model =

In the mathematical theory of probability, the voter model is an interacting particle system introduced by Richard A. Holley and Thomas M. Liggett in 1975.

voter model coexists on the graph with two clusters

One can imagine that there is a "voter" at each point on a connected graph, where the connections indicate that there is some form of interaction between a pair of voters (nodes). The opinions of any given voter on some issue changes at random times under the influence of opinions of his neighbours. A voter's opinion at any given time can take one of two values, labelled 0 and 1. At random times, a random individual is selected and that voter's opinion is changed according to a stochastic rule. Specifically, one of the chosen voter's neighbors is chosen according to a given set of probabilities and that neighbor’s opinion is transferred to the chosen voter.

An alternative interpretation is in terms of spatial conflict. Suppose two nations control the areas (sets of nodes) labelled 0 or 1. A flip from 0 to 1 at a given location indicates an invasion of that site by the other nation.

Note that only one flip happens each time. Problems involving the voter model will often be recast in terms of the dual system of coalescing Markov chains. Frequently, these problems will then be reduced to others involving independent Markov chains.

== Definition ==
A voter model is a (continuous time) Markov process $\eta_t$ with state space $S=\{0,1\}^{Z^d}$ and transition rates function $c(x,\eta)$, where $Z^d$ is a d-dimensional integer lattice, and $c($•,•$)$ is assumed to be nonnegative, uniformly bounded and continuous as a function of $\eta$ in the product topology on $S$. Each component $\eta \in S$ is called a configuration. To make it clear that $\eta(x)$ stands for the value of a site x in configuration $\eta(.)$; while $\eta_t(x)$ means the value of a site x in configuration $\eta(.)$ at time $t$.

The dynamic of the process are specified by the collection of transition rates. For voter models, the rate at which there is a flip at $\scriptstyle x$ from 0 to 1 or vice versa is given by a function $c(x,\eta)$ of site $x$. It has the following properties:

1. $c(x,\eta)=0$ for every $x \in Z^d$ if $\eta \equiv 0$ or if $\eta \equiv 1$
2. $c(x,\eta)=c(x,\zeta)$ for every $x \in Z^d$ if $\eta(y)+\zeta(y)=1$ for all $y \in Z^d$
3. $c(x,\eta)\leq c(x,\zeta)$ if $\eta\leq \zeta$ and $\eta(x)=\zeta(x)=0$
4. $c(x,\eta)$ is invariant under shifts in $\scriptstyle Z^d$

Property (1) says that $\eta\equiv 0$ and $\eta\equiv 1$ are fixed points for the evolution. (2) indicates that the evolution is unchanged by interchanging the roles of 0's and 1's. In property (3), $\eta\leq \zeta$ means $\forall x,\eta(x)\leq\zeta(x)$, and $\eta \leq \zeta$ implies $c(x,\eta)\leq c(x,\zeta)$ if $\eta(x)=\zeta(x)=0$, and implies $c(x,\eta)\geq c(x,\zeta)$ if $\eta(x)=\zeta(x)=1$.

=== Clustering and coexistence ===
The interest in is the limiting behavior of the models. Since the flip rates of a site depends on its neighbours, it is obvious that when all sites take the same value, the whole system stops changing forever. Therefore, a voter model has two trivial extremal stationary distributions, the point-masses $\scriptstyle \delta_0$ and $\scriptstyle \delta_1$ on $\scriptstyle \eta \equiv 0$ or $\scriptstyle \eta\equiv 1$ respectively, which represent consensus. The main question to be discussed is whether or not there are others, which would then represent coexistence of different opinions in equilibrium. It is said coexistence occurs if there is a stationary distribution that concentrates on configurations with infinitely many 0's and 1's. On the other hand, if for all $\scriptstyle x,y\in Z^d$ and all initial configurations, then

$$\lim_{t\rightarrow \infty}P[\eta_t(x)\neq\eta_t(y)]=0$$

It is said that clustering occurs.

It is important to distinguish clustering with the concept of cluster. Clusters are defined to be the connected components of $\scriptstyle \{x:\eta(x)=0\}$ or $\scriptstyle \{x:\eta(x)=1\}$.

== The linear voter model ==
=== Model description ===
This section will be dedicated to one of the basic voter models, the Linear Voter Model.

If $\scriptstyle p($•,•$\scriptstyle)$ be the transition probabilities for an irreducible random walk on $\scriptstyle Z^d$, then:

$$p(x,y)\geq 0 \quad\text{and} \sum_{y}p(x,y)=1$$

Then in Linear voter model, the transition rates are linear functions of $\scriptstyle \eta$:

$$c(x,\eta)= \left\{
\begin{array}{l}
\sum_y p(x,y)\eta(y) \quad \text{for all}\quad \eta(x)=0  \\
\sum_y p(x,y)(1-\eta(y)) \quad \text{for all}\quad \eta(x)=1   \\
\end{array} \right.$$

Or if $\scriptstyle \eta_x$ indicates that a flip happens at $\scriptstyle x$, then transition rates are simply:

$$\eta\rightarrow\eta_x \quad\text{at rate} \sum_{y:\eta(y)\neq\eta(x)}p(x,y).$$

A process of coalescing random walks $\scriptstyle A_t\subset Z^d$ is defined as follows. Here $\scriptstyle A_t$ denotes the set of sites occupied by these random walks at time $\scriptstyle t$. To define $\scriptstyle A_t$, consider several (continuous time) random walks on $\scriptstyle Z^d$ with unit exponential holding times and transition probabilities $\scriptstyle p($•,•$\scriptstyle )$, and take them to be independent until two of them meet. At that time, the two that meet coalesce into one particle, which continues to move like a random walk with transition probabilities $\scriptstyle p($•,•$\scriptstyle )$ .

The concept of Duality is essential for analysing the behavior of the voter models. The linear voter models satisfy a very useful form of duality, known as coalescing duality, which is:

$$P^\eta(\eta_t\equiv 1 \quad\text{on }A)=P^A(\eta(A_t)\equiv 1),$$

where $\scriptstyle \eta \in \{0,1\}^{Z^d}$ is the initial configuration of $\scriptstyle \eta_t$ and $\scriptstyle A=\{x\in Z^d, \eta(x)=1\}\subset Z^d$ is the initial state of the coalescing random walks $\scriptstyle A_t$.

=== Limiting behaviors of linear voter models ===
Let $\scriptstyle p(x,y)$ be the transition probabilities for an irreducible random walk on $\scriptstyle Z^d$ and $\scriptstyle p(x,y)=p(0,x-y)$, then the duality relation for such linear voter models says that $\scriptstyle \forall\eta\in S=\{0,1\}^{Z^d}$

$$P^{\eta}[\eta_t(x)\neq\eta_t(y)]=P[\eta(X_t)\neq\eta(Y_t)]$$

where $\scriptstyle X_t$ and $\scriptstyle Y_t$ are (continuous time) random walks on $\scriptstyle Z^d$ with $\scriptstyle X_0=x$, $\scriptstyle Y_0=y$, and $\scriptstyle \eta(X_t)$ is the position taken by the random walk at time $\scriptstyle t$. $\scriptstyle X_t$ and $\scriptstyle Y_t$ forms a coalescing random walks described at the end of section 2.1. $\scriptstyle X(t)-Y(t)$ is a symmetrized random walk. If $\scriptstyle X(t)-Y(t)$ is recurrent and $\scriptstyle d\leq 2$, $\scriptstyle X_t$ and $\scriptstyle Y_t$ will hit eventually with probability 1, and hence

$$P^{\eta}[\eta_t(x)\neq\eta_t(y)]=P[\eta(X_t)\neq\eta(Y_t)]\leq P[X_t\neq Y_t]\rightarrow 0\quad\text{as}\quad t\to 0$$

Therefore, the process clusters.

On the other hand, when $d\geq 3$, the system coexists. It is because for $\scriptstyle d\geq 3$, $\scriptstyle X(t)-Y(t)$ is transient, thus there is a positive probability that the random walks never hit, and hence for $\scriptstyle x\neq y$

$$\lim_{t\rightarrow\infty}P[\eta_t(x)\neq\eta_t(y)]=C\lim_{t\rightarrow\infty}P[X_t\neq Y_t]>0$$

for some constant $C$ corresponding to the initial distribution.

If $\scriptstyle \tilde{X}(t)=X(t)-Y(t)$ be a symmetrized random walk, then there are the following theorems:

Theorem 2.1

The linear voter model $\scriptstyle \eta_t$ clusters if $\scriptstyle \tilde{X}_t$ is recurrent, and coexists if $\scriptstyle \tilde{X}_t$ is transient. In particular,

1. the process clusters if $\scriptstyle d=1$ and $\scriptstyle \sum_x |x|p(0,x)\le \infty$, or if $\scriptstyle d=2$ and $\scriptstyle \sum_x |x|^2p(0,x)\le\infty$;
2. the process coexists if $\scriptstyle d \geq 3$.

Remarks: To contrast this with the behavior of the threshold voter models that will be discussed in next section, note that whether the linear voter model clusters or coexists depends almost exclusively on the dimension of the set of sites, rather than on the size of the range of interaction.

Theorem 2.2 Suppose $\scriptstyle \mu$ is any translation spatially ergodic and invariant probability measure on the state space $\scriptstyle S=\{0,1\}^{Z^d}$, then

1. If $\scriptstyle \tilde{X}_t$ is recurrent, then $\scriptstyle \mu S(t)\Rightarrow \rho\delta_1+(1-\rho)\delta_0\quad\text{as}\quad t\to\infty$;
2. If $\scriptstyle \tilde{X}_t$ is transient, then $\scriptstyle \mu S(t)\Rightarrow \mu_\rho$.

where $\scriptstyle \mu S(t)$ is the distribution of $\scriptstyle \eta_t$; $\scriptstyle \Rightarrow$ means weak convergence, $\scriptstyle \mu_{\rho}$ is a nontrivial extremal invariant measure and $\scriptstyle \rho=\mu(\{\eta:\eta(x)=1\})$.

=== A special linear voter model ===
One of the interesting special cases of the linear voter model, known as the basic linear voter model, is that for state space $\scriptstyle \{0,1\}^{Z^d}$:

$$p(x,y)= \begin{cases}
1/2d & \text{if } |x-y|=1 \text{ and } \eta(x)\neq\eta(y) \\[8pt]
0 & \text{otherwise}
\end{cases}$$

So that

$$\eta_t(x)\to 1-\eta_t(x)\quad\text{at rate}\quad (2d)^{-1}|\{y:|y-x|=1,\eta_t(y)\neq\eta_t(x)\}|$$

In this case, the process clusters if $\scriptstyle d\leq 2$, while coexists if $\scriptstyle d\geq 3$. This dichotomy is closely related to the fact that simple random walk on $\scriptstyle Z^d$ is recurrent if $\scriptstyle d\leq2$ and transient if $\scriptstyle d\geq 3$.

==== Clusters in one dimension d = 1 ====
For the special case with $\scriptstyle d=1$, $\scriptstyle S=Z^1$ and $\scriptstyle p(x,x+1)=p(x,x-1)=\frac{1}{2}$ for each $\scriptstyle x$. From Theorem 2.2, $\scriptstyle \mu S(t)\Rightarrow \rho\delta_1+(1-\rho)\delta_0$, thus clustering occurs in this case. The aim of this section is to give a more precise description of this clustering.

As mentioned before, clusters of an $\scriptstyle \eta$ are defined to be the connected components of $\scriptstyle \{x:\eta(x)=0\}$ or $\scriptstyle \{x:\eta(x)=1\}$. The mean cluster size for $\scriptstyle \eta$ is defined to be:

$$C(\eta)=\lim_{n\rightarrow\infty}\frac{2n}{\text{number of clusters in} [-n,n]}$$

provided the limit exists.

Proposition 2.3

Suppose the voter model is with initial distribution $\scriptstyle \mu$ and $\scriptstyle \mu$ is a translation invariant probability measure, then

$$P\left(C(\eta)=\frac{1}{P[\eta_t(0)\neq \eta_t(1)]}\right)=1.$$

==== Occupation time ====
Define the occupation time functionals of the basic linear voter model as:

$$T_t^x=\int_0^t \eta^\rho_s(x)\mathrm{d}s.$$

Theorem 2.4

Assume that for all site x and time t, $\scriptstyle P(\eta_t(x)=1)=\rho$, then as $\scriptstyle t\rightarrow \infty$, $\scriptstyle T_t^x/t\rightarrow \rho$ almost surely if $\scriptstyle d\geq 2$

proof

By Chebyshev's inequality and the Borel–Cantelli lemma, there is the equation below:

$$P\left(\frac{\rho}{r}\leq \lim \inf_{t\rightarrow\infty}\frac{T_t}{t}\leq\lim\sup_{t\rightarrow\infty}\frac{T_t}{t}\leq \rho r\right)=1; \quad\forall r>1$$

The theorem follows when letting $\scriptstyle r\searrow 1$.

== The threshold voter model ==
=== Model description ===
This section concentrates on a kind of non-linear voter model, known as the threshold voter model. To define it, let $\scriptstyle \mathcal{N}$ be a neighbourhood of $\scriptstyle 0\in Z^d$ that is obtained by intersecting $\scriptstyle Z^d$ with any compact, convex, symmetric set in $\scriptstyle R^d$; in other words, $\scriptstyle \mathcal{N}$ is assumed to be a finite set that is symmetric with respect to all reflections and irreducible (i.e. the group it generates is $\scriptstyle Z^d$). It can always be assumed that $\scriptstyle \mathcal{N}$ contains all the unit vectors $\scriptstyle (1,0,0,\dots,0),\dots,(0,\dots,0,1)$. For a positive integer $\scriptstyle T$, the threshold voter model with neighbourhood $\scriptstyle \mathcal{N}$ and threshold $\scriptstyle T$ is the one with rate function:

$$c(x,\eta)= \left\{
\begin{array}{l}
1 \quad  \text{if}\quad |\{y\in x+\mathcal{N}:\eta(y)\neq\eta(x)\}|\geq T \\
0 \quad  \text{otherwise}  \\
\end{array} \right.$$

Simply put, the transition rate of site $\scriptstyle x$ is 1 if the number of sites that do not take the same value is larger or equal to the threshold T. Otherwise, site $\scriptstyle x$ stays at the current status and will not flip.

For example, if $\scriptstyle d=1$, $\scriptstyle \mathcal{N}=\{-1,0,1\}$ and $\scriptstyle T=2$, then the configuration $\scriptstyle \dots1\quad 1\quad 0\quad 0\quad 1\quad 1\quad 0\quad 0\dots$ is an absorbing state or a trap for the process.

=== Limiting behaviors of threshold voter model ===
If a threshold voter model does not fixate, the process should be expected to will coexist for small threshold and cluster for large threshold, where large and small are interpreted as being relative to the size of the neighbourhood, $\scriptstyle |\mathcal{N}|$. The intuition is that having a small threshold makes it easy for flips to occur, so it is likely that there will be a lot of both 0's and 1's around at all times. The following are three major results:

1. If $\scriptstyle T>\frac{|\mathcal{N}|-1}{2}$, then the process fixates in the sense that each site flips only finitely often.
2. If $\scriptstyle d=1$ and $\scriptstyle T=\frac{|\mathcal{N}|-1}{2}$, then the process clusters.
3. If $\scriptstyle T=\theta|\mathcal{N}|$ with $\scriptstyle \theta$ sufficiently small($\scriptstyle \theta<\frac{1}{4}$) and $\scriptstyle |\mathcal{N}|$ sufficiently large, then the process coexists.

Here are two theorems corresponding to properties (1) and (2).

Theorem 3.1

If $\scriptstyle T>\frac{|\mathcal{N}|-1}{2}$, then the process fixates.

Theorem 3.2

The threshold voter model in one dimension ($\scriptstyle d=1$) with $\scriptstyle \mathcal{N}=\{-T,\dots,T\}, T\geq 1$, clusters.

proof

The idea of the proof is to construct two sequences of random times $\scriptstyle U_n$, $\scriptstyle V_n$ for $\scriptstyle n\geq 1$ with the following properties:

1. $\scriptstyle 0=V_0<U_1<V_1<U_2<V_2<\dots$,
2. $\scriptstyle \{U_{k+1}-V_k,k\geq0\}$ are i.i.d.with $\scriptstyle \mathrm{E}(U_{k+1}-V_k)<\infty$,
3. $\scriptstyle \{V_{k}-U_k,k\geq1\}$ are i.i.d.with $\scriptstyle \mathrm{E}(V_{k}-U_k)=\infty$,
4. the random variables in (b) and (c) are independent of each other,
5. event A=$\scriptstyle \{\eta_t(.)$ is constant on $\scriptstyle \{-T,\dots,T\}\}$, and event A holds for every $\scriptstyle t \in \cup_{k=1}^\infty [U_k,V_k]$.

Once this construction is made, it will follow from renewal theory that

$$P(A)\geq P(t \in \cup_{k=1}^\infty [U_k,V_k])\to 1 \quad\text{as}\quad t\to\infty$$

Hence,$\scriptstyle \lim_{t\rightarrow \infty}P(\eta_t(1)\neq \eta_t(0))=0$, so that the process clusters.

Remarks: (a) Threshold models in higher dimensions do not necessarily cluster if $\scriptstyle T=\frac{|\mathcal{N}|-1}{2}$. For example, take $\scriptstyle d=2,T=2$ and $\scriptstyle \mathcal{N}=\{(0,0),(0,1),(1,0),(0,-1),(-1,0)\}$. If $\scriptstyle \eta$ is constant on alternating vertical infinite strips, that is for all $\scriptstyle i,j$:

$$\eta(4i,j)=\eta(4i+1,j)=1,\quad \eta(4i+2,j)=\eta(4i+3,j)=0$$

then no transition ever occur, and the process fixates.

(b) Under the assumption of Theorem 3.2, the process does not fixate. To see this, consider the initial configuration $\scriptstyle \dots 0 0 0 1 1 1 \dots$, in which infinitely many zeros are followed by infinitely many ones. Then only the zero and one at the boundary can flip, so that the configuration will always look the same except that the boundary will move like a simple symmetric random walk. The fact that this random walk is recurrent implies that every site flips infinitely often.

Property 3 indicates that the threshold voter model is quite different from the linear voter model, in that coexistence occurs even in one dimension, provided that the neighbourhood is not too small. The threshold model has a drift toward the "local minority", which is not present in the linear case.

Most proofs of coexistence for threshold voter models are based on comparisons with hybrid model known as the threshold contact process with parameter $\scriptstyle \lambda>0$. This is the process on $\scriptstyle [0,1]^{Z^d}$ with flip rates:

$$c(x,\eta)= \left\{
\begin{array}{l}
\lambda \quad \text{if}\quad\eta(x)=0\quad \text{and}|\{y\in x+\mathcal{N}:\eta(y)=1\}|\geq T; \\
1 \quad \text{if}\quad \eta(x)=1;\\
0 \quad \text{otherwise}
\end{array}\right.$$

Proposition 3.3

For any $\scriptstyle d, \mathcal{N}$ and $\scriptstyle T$, if the threshold contact process with $\scriptstyle \lambda=1$ has a nontrivial invariant measure, then the threshold voter model coexists.

=== Model with threshold T = 1 ===
The case that $\scriptstyle T=1$ is of particular interest because it is the only case in which it is known exactly which models coexist and which models cluster.

In particular, there is interest in a kind of Threshold T=1 model with $\scriptstyle c(x,\eta)$ that is given by:

$$c(x,\eta)= \left\{
\begin{array}{l}
1 \quad\text{if exists one}\quad y \quad\text{with}\quad |x-y|\leq N \quad\text{and}\quad \eta(x)\neq\eta(y) \\
0 \quad \text{otherwise}\\
\end{array} \right.$$

$\scriptstyle N$ can be interpreted as the radius of the neighbourhood $\scriptstyle \mathcal{N}$; $\scriptstyle N$ determines the size of the neighbourhood (i.e., if $\scriptstyle \mathcal{N}_1=\{-2,-1,0,1,2\}$, then $\scriptstyle N_1=2$; while for $\scriptstyle \mathcal{N}_2=\{(0,0),(0,1),(1,0),(0,-1),(-1,0)\}$, the corresponding $\scriptstyle N_2=1$).

By Theorem 3.2, the model with $\scriptstyle d=1$ and $\scriptstyle \mathcal{N}=\{-1,0,1\}$ clusters. The following theorem indicates that for all other choices of $\scriptstyle d$ and $\scriptstyle \mathcal{N}$, the model coexists.

Theorem 3.4

Suppose that $\scriptstyle N\geq 1$, but $\scriptstyle (N,d)\neq(1,1)$. Then the threshold model on $\scriptstyle Z^d$ with parameter $\scriptstyle N$ coexists.

The proof of this theorem is given in a paper named "Coexistence in threshold voter models" by Thomas M. Liggett.

== See also ==
- Probabilistic Cellular Automata
- sequential dynamical system
- contact process
