= Homeokinetics =

Homeokinetics is the study of self-organizing, complex systems. Standard physics studies systems at separate levels, such as atomic physics, nuclear physics, biophysics, social physics, and galactic physics. Homeokinetic physics studies the up-down processes that bind these levels. Tools such as mechanics, quantum field theory, and the laws of thermodynamics provide the key relationships. The subject, described as the physics and thermodynamics associated with the up down movement between levels of systems, originated in the late 1970s work of American physicists Harry Soodak and Arthur Iberall. Complex systems are universes, galaxies, social systems, people, or even those that seem as simple as gases. The basic premise is that the entire universe consists of atomistic-like units bound in interactive ensembles to form systems, level by level, in a nested hierarchy. Homeokinetics treats all complex systems on an equal footing, animate and inanimate, providing them with a common viewpoint. The complexity in studying how they work is reduced by the emergence of common languages in all complex systems.

== History ==
Arthur Iberall, Warren McCulloch and Harry Soodak developed the concept of homeokinetics as a new branch of physics. It began through Iberall's biophysical research for the NASA exobiology program into the dynamics of mammalian physiological processes They were observing an area that physics has neglected, that of complex systems with their very long internal factory day delays. They were observing systems associated with nested hierarchy and with an extensive range of time scale processes. It was such connections, referred to as both up-down or in-out connections (as nested hierarchy) and side-side or flatland physics among atomistic-like components (as heterarchy) that became the hallmark of homeokinetic problems. By 1975, they began to put a formal catch-phrase name on those complex problems, associating them with nature, life, human, mind, and society. The major method of exposition that they began using was a combination of engineering physics and a more academic pure physics. In 1981, Iberall was invited to the Crump Institute for Medical Engineering of UCLA, where he further refined the key concepts of homeokinetics, developing a physical scientific foundation for complex systems.

== Self-organizing complex Systems ==
A system is a collective of interacting ‘atomistic’-like entities. The word ‘atomism’ is used to stand both for the entity and the doctrine. As is known from ‘kinetic’ theory, in mobile or simple systems, the atomisms share their ‘energy’ in interactive collisions. That so-called ‘equipartitioning’ process takes place within a few collisions. Physically, if there is little or no interaction, the process is considered to be very weak. Physics deals basically with the forces of interaction—few in number—that influence the interactions. They all tend to emerge with considerable force at high ‘density’ of atomistic interaction. In complex systems, there is also a result of internal processes in the atomisms. They exhibit, in addition to the pair-by-pair interactions, internal actions such as vibrations, rotations, and association. If the energy and time involved internally creates a very large—in time—cycle of performance of their actions compared to their pair interactions, the collective system is complex. If you eat a cookie and you do not see the resulting action for hours, that is complex; if boy meets girl and they become ‘engaged’ for a protracted period, that is complex. What emerges from that physics is a broad host of changes in state and stability transitions in state. Viewing Aristotle as having defined a general basis for systems in their static-logical states and trying to identify a logic-metalogic for physics, e.g., metaphysics, then homeokinetics is viewed to be an attempt to define the dynamics of all those systems in the universe.

== Flatland physics vs. homeokinetic physics ==
Ordinary physics is a flatland physics, a physics at some particular level. Examples include nuclear and atomic physics, biophysics, social physics, and stellar physics. Homeokinetic physics combines flatland physics with the study of the up down processes that binds the levels. Tools, such as mechanics, quantum field theory, and the laws of thermodynamics, provide key relationships for the binding of the levels, how they connect, and how the energy flows up and down. And whether the atomisms are atoms, molecules, cells, people, stars, galaxies, or universes, the same tools can be used to understand them. Homeokinetics treats all complex systems on an equal footing, animate and inanimate, providing them with a common viewpoint. The complexity in studying how they work is reduced by the emergence of common languages in all complex systems.

== Applications ==
A homeokinetic approach to complex systems has been applied to understanding life, ecological psychology, mind, anthropology, geology, law, motor control, bioenergetics, healing modalities, and political science.

It has also been applied to social physics where a homeokinetics analysis shows that one must account for flow variables such as the flow of energy, of materials, of action, reproduction rate, and value-in-exchange. Iberall's conjectures on life and mind have been used as a springboard to develop theories of mental activity and action.
