= Harry Soodak =

American physicist and professor

- Born: December 24, 1920; New York City, New York, U.S.
- Died: September 30, 2008 (aged 87)
- Education: City College of New York; Columbia University; Duke University
- Known for: homeokinetics
- Scientific career
- Fields: Physics and design of nuclear reactors
- Workplaces: Manhattan Project, Massachusetts Institute of Technology, City College of New York

Harry Soodak (December 24, 1920 – September 30, 2008) was an American physicist who worked on the Manhattan Project, publishing the first design of a sodium-cooled breeder reactor, and was a professor at City College of New York. Along with Arthur Iberall, Soodak developed the concept of homeokinetics to explain the functioning of complex systems.

== Biography ==
Soodak was born in New York City. Married to Martha for 55 years, they had three children Deborah, Robert, and Lenore.

Soodak received his bachelor's degree from the City College of New York (CCNY) in February 1940, a master's degree from Columbia University, and his Ph.D. from Duke University in 1944.

Soodak worked on the Manhattan Project at Oak Ridge National Laboratory where he gave courses on nuclear physics and reactor theory. According to Oak Ridge Director Alvin M. Weinberg, these courses were "phenomenally successful" and Soodak had the reputation in the United States Atomic Energy Commission of being "one of the clearest lecturers in the business.” In 1945, Harry and Eugene Wigner published the first design of a sodium-cooled breeder reactor. Following work at the Manhattan Project, he served as a research associate at Massachusetts Institute of Technology for nearly three years. In 1949, Soodak joined the physics department of his alma mater, City College of New York. He retired in 1992.

== Contributions ==
Soodak signed the July 13, 1945 addendum to the Szilard petition that asked that the Japanese be given the opportunity to surrender before bombing them. Commenting on Soodak's early work, as well as his continuing contributions to nuclear physics after coming to CCNY – which included lecturing on nuclear theory in the graduate schools of NYU and of Columbia – Mark W. Zemansky, who was then chairman of the physics department at CCNY, wrote in 1958: "During the war, Dr. Soodak made a name for himself in the field of reactor design. Through his theoretical work, in books and articles, and his practical applications, he has become a leading international authority on the design of nuclear reactors. There is hardly a handbook or treatise to which he has not contributed or served in an editorial capacity." Without doubt Harry Soodak's greatest legacy is the decisive influence he had on the hundreds of undergraduate students he taught and advised at CCNY.

In the 1970s, Soodak began working with Arthur Iberall in an area of complex systems. They were observing an area that physics has neglected, that of complex systems with their very long internal factory day delays. These systems are associated with nested hierarchy and with an extensive range of time scale processes. It was such connections, referred to as both up-down or in-out connections (as nested hierarchy) and side-side or flatland physics among atomistic-like components (as heterarchy) that became the hallmark of homeokinetic problems. By 1975, they began to describe homeokinetics, the physics of complex, self-organizing systems, as dealing with the problems of nature, life, humankind, mind, and society.

The Harry Soodak Memorial Scholarship at the CCNY Physics Department was created in his honor.

== Patents ==
- Fast neutron reactor, (1961).

== Honors ==
Fellow of the American Nuclear Society, 1962.
Outstanding Teacher Award, CCNY, 1987.

== Publications ==
=== Books ===
- 1950. Soodak, H.; Campbell, E.C., Elementary Pile Theory, New York, NY: John Wiley and Sons, ISBN 978-1-114-55791-8
- 1962. Soodak, Harry (ed.), Reactor Handbook Volume III: Physics, NY: Interscience Publishers

=== Conference and Government Publications ===
- Nordheim, L.W., H. Soodak and G. Nordheim. Thermal Effects of Propellent Gases in Erosion Vents and Guns. National Defense Research Committee, Office of Scientific Research and Development, 1944.
- Soodak, H. Pile perturbation theory. Atomic Energy Commission, 1946.
- Soodak, H. A Radiation Study of the Tractor-Trailer (Tug-Tow) Craft. No. LP-126. Massachusetts Inst. Tech., Cambridge. Lexington Project, 1948.
- Soodak, H. The science and engineering of nuclear power. United Nations, N.Y. 1948.
- Soodak, H. Problems of reactor kinetics. Proceedings of Symposia in Applied Mathematics. Vol. 11. 1961.
- Iberall, A.S. and H. Soodak. Primer for homeokinetics: A physical foundation for physical systems. Homeokinetics Conference, Univ. Connecticut, Storrs, CT. Cri-de-Coeur Press, Laguna Hills, CA, 1998.
- Soodak, Harry. Geometric top theory of football, discus, javelin. Engineering of Sport 5: Proc. Fifth Int. Conf. on the Engineering of Sport, Davis, CA. Vol. 1. 2004.

=== Selected articles ===
- Soodak, H. Pile kinetics. In: C. Goodman (ed.). The Science and Engineering of Nuclear Power, 89-102, 1949.
- Soodak, H., E.C. Campbell and H.C. Schweinler. Elementary Pile Theory, Am. J. Phys.18:403,1950. https://dx.doi.org/10.aaa9/1.1932621
- Soodak, H. Energy production from nuclear reactions. Trans. N.Y. Acad. Sci., 22.1 Ser. II 26-33, 1959.
- Fleishman, M.R. and H. Soodak. Methods and cross sections for calculating the fast effect. Nuc. Sci. Eng., 7:217, 1960.
- Thumm, W., D.E. Tilly, S.J. Inglis and H. Soodak. Physics: A modern approach and physics: An ebb and flow of ideas. Physics Today, 25:83, 1972.
- Iberall, A.S. and H. Soodak. Physical basis for complex systems—Some propositions relating levels of organization. Collective Phenomena 3:9-24, 1978.
- Iberall, A.S., H. Soodak and F. Hassler. A field and circuit thermodynamics for integrative physiology. II. Power and communicational spectroscopy in biology. Am. J. Physiol. 234(1):R3-R19, 1978.
- Soodak H. and A.S. Iberall. Homeokinetics: A physical science for complex systems. Science 201:579, 1978.
- Soodak, H. and A.S. Iberall. Osmosis, diffusion, convection. Am. J. Physiol. 235:R3-R17, 1978.
- Soodak, H. and A.S. Iberall. Forum on osmosis. IV. More on osmosis and diffusion. Am. J. Physiol. 237: R114, 1979.
- Iberall, A.S., H. Soodak and C. Arensberg. Homeokinetic physics of societies – A new discipline: Autonomous groups, cultures, polities. In: H. Reul et al. (eds.). Perspectives in Biomechanics, Vol. I, Part A. Harwood Academic Press, N.Y., pp. 433–527, 1980.
- Gersten, Joel, Harry Soodak, and Martin Tiersten. Jack and the skyhook: The beanstalk revisited. Am. J. Phy. 49.2:118-119, 1981.
- Iberall, A. and H. Soodak. A physics for complex systems. In: F. Yates, (ed.), Self-Organizing Systems, Plenum Press, N.Y., pp. 499–520, 1987.
- Soodak, Harry. On Origins Galaxies, Stars, Life. In: F. Yates, (ed.), Self-Organizing Systems, Plenum Press, N.Y. pp. 17–31, 1987.
- Soodak, H. and A. Iberall. Thermodynamics and complex systems. In: F.E. Yates, (ed.). Self-Organizing Systems: The Emergence of Order, Plenum Press, N.Y., pp. 459–469, 1987.
- Gersten, J., H. Soodak and M.S. Tiersten. Ball moving on stationary or rotating horizontal surface. Am. J. Phys. 60:43, 1992. https://dx.doi.org/10.1119/1.17041
- Soodak, H. and M.S. Tiersten. Wakes and waves in N dimensions. Am. J. Phys. 61:395, 1993. https://dx.doi.org/10.1119/1.17230
- Soodak, H. and M.S. Tiersten. Dynamic interpretation of Maxwell’s equations. Am. J. Phys. 62:907, 1994. https://dx.doi.org/10.1119/1.17680
- Soodak, H. and M.S. Tiersten. Resolution analysis of gyroscopic motion. Am. J. Phys. 62: 687, 1994. https://dx.doi.org/10.1119/1.17497
- Soodak, H, and M.S. Tiersten. Perturbation analysis of rolling friction on a turntable. Am. J. Phys. 64:1130, 1996. https://dx.doi.org/10.1119/1.18333
- Tiersten, M.S. and H. Soodak. Propagation of a Feynman error on real and inertial forces in rotating systems. Am. J. Phys. 66:810, 1998. https://dx.doi.org/10.1119/1.18962
- Tiersten, M.S. and Harry Soodak. Dropped objects and other motions relative to the noninertial earth. Am. J. Phys. 68:129, 2000. https://dx.doi.org/10.1119/1.19385
- Iberall, A., F. Hassler, H. Soodak and D. Wilkinson. Invitation to an enterprise: From physics to world history to the study of civilizations. Com. Civ. Rev., 42:4-22, 2000.
- Soodak, H. A geometric theory of rapidly spinning tops, tipped tops, and footballs. Am. J. Phys. 70:815, 2002. https://dx.doi.org/10.1119/1.1479741
