= Norman Matloff =

American computer scientist and statistician (1948–2026)

- Born: Norman Saul Matloff; December 16, 1948; Los Angeles, California, U.S.
- Died: June 12, 2026 (aged 77)
- Resting place: Cypress Lawn Memorial Park, Colma, California
- Education: California State Polytechnic University, Pomona; University of California, Los Angeles
- Known for: Books on R, data science and programming; writings on H-1B visa policy
- Awards: UC Davis Distinguished Public Service Award (2002); UC Davis Distinguished Teaching Award
- Scientific career
- Fields: Computer science, statistics, data science, parallel computing, machine learning
- Workplaces: University of California, Davis
- Thesis: Equilibrium Behavior in an Infinite Voting Model (1975)
- Doctoral advisor: Thomas M. Liggett
- Website: heather.cs.ucdavis.edu

Norman Saul Matloff (December 16, 1948 – June 12, 2026) was an American computer scientist, statistician and professor at the University of California, Davis. His work included probability, statistics, data security, parallel computing, machine learning, and statistical computing in R. He was the author of books on R, Python, debugging, parallel computing, probability and statistics, and regression and classification. Matloff also wrote and testified on employment, immigration, affirmative action, age discrimination and technology labor policy.

== Early life and education ==
Matloff was born in Los Angeles and grew up in East Los Angeles and the San Gabriel Valley. His father was an immigrant from Lithuania, and Matloff grew up in a household in which his parents spoke Yiddish to each other.

He attended Cal Poly Pomona, majoring in mathematics and minoring in economics. Matloff took his first programming course as a freshman in 1966. He then entered the Ph.D. program in mathematics at the University of California, Los Angeles, where he worked in abstract probability theory and functional analysis with Thomas M. Liggett. According to the Mathematics Genealogy Project, he received his Ph.D. from UCLA in 1975 with the dissertation Equilibrium Behavior in an Infinite Voting Model. Matloff also described statisticians Thomas S. Ferguson and Olive Jean Dunn as important influences on his later views about statistical significance testing.

== Academic career ==
Matloff joined the UC Davis faculty in 1975 after completing his doctorate at UCLA. At the time, the UC Davis Department of Mathematics included an informal statistics subgroup. Matloff and others helped form the UC Davis Department of Statistics in 1979, then organized as an intercollegiate division.

During the rise of personal computing, Matloff took a one-year leave to work in Silicon Valley. He returned to UC Davis in fall 1980 with a joint appointment involving statistics and electrical and computer engineering. He later participated in the establishment of the Division of Computer Science within the Department of Electrical and Computer Engineering; the division became the UC Davis Department of Computer Science in 1989. In 2023, he retired after 48 years on the UC Davis faculty, while stating that he intended to continue research, writing books, and developing software. He remained active as a professor emeritus.

== Research and writing ==
Matloff's early research grew out of his dissertation in probability theory. He published papers in The Annals of Probability and Zeitschrift für Wahrscheinlichkeitstheorie und Verwandte Gebiete based on that work. His experience as a statistical consultant for Kaiser Permanente led to a paper in Biometrika on the asymptotics of averaged regression functions, which he later described as influential on much of his subsequent work.

After moving into computer science, Matloff worked on parallel computation, data security and machine learning, often drawing on his statistical background. His data-security research led to his appointment to IFIP Working Group 11.3, an international group focused on database security. He also wrote on fairness in machine learning and criticized some uses of significance testing and differential privacy.

Matloff was editor-in-chief of The R Journal. He wrote several books on statistical computing and programming, including The Art of R Programming, The Art of Debugging with GDB, DDD, and Eclipse, and Parallel Computing for Data Science. His textbook Statistical Regression and Classification: From Linear Models to Machine Learning received the 2017 Ziegel Award.

== Public policy writing ==
Matloff wrote extensively about employment and immigration issues in the technology industry, especially the H-1B visa program. UC Davis described him in 2002 as a critic of using young skilled foreign workers on short-term visas to fill computer-industry jobs, arguing that the practice could displace older American programmers and leave foreign-born workers vulnerable to exploitation.

His policy work included testimony before the United States Senate and United States House of Representatives on immigration issues, expert-witness work in age-discrimination lawsuits, and advice to federal and state agencies including the U.S. Departments of Commerce and State and the White House. UC Davis also noted his work on affirmative action, age discrimination, minority outreach, and cases involving alleged racial discrimination against Asian Americans. His views appeared in national media outlets, including Fortune, The New York Times, Los Angeles Times, and CNN.

== Awards and honors ==
In 2002, Matloff received a UC Davis Distinguished Public Service Award. The UC Davis Academic Senate gives the award annually to recognize distinguished contributions to public service at the world, national, state, and community levels. He also received the campus-wide UC Davis Distinguished Teaching Award.

== Death ==
Matloff died on June 12, 2026, at the age of 77. He had been diagnosed with cancer, and continued writing, developing software and mentoring students after the diagnosis. He was survived by his wife, Gamis Yu, and his daughter, Laura Matloff. A memorial service and graveside service were held on July 5, 2026, at Cypress Lawn Memorial Park in Colma, California, where he was buried.

At the time of his death, Matloff was working on a linear algebra textbook co-authored with his daughter, to be published posthumously.

== Selected books ==
- Matloff, Norman (1988). Probability Modeling and Computer Simulation: An Integrated Introduction With Applications to Engineering and Computer Science. Wadsworth. ISBN 9780534918545.
- Matloff, Norman (1992). IBM Microcomputer Architecture and Assembly Language: A Look Under The Hood. Prentice Hall. ISBN 9780134519982.
- Matloff, Norman; Salzman, Peter Jay (2008). The Art of Debugging with GDB, DDD, and Eclipse. No Starch Press. ISBN 9781593271749.
- Matloff, Norman (2011). The Art of R Programming: A Tour of Statistical Software Design. No Starch Press. ISBN 9781593273842.
- Matloff, Norman (2015). Parallel Computing for Data Science: With Examples in R, C++ and CUDA. Chapman and Hall/CRC. ISBN 9781466587014.
- Matloff, Norman (2017). Statistical Regression and Classification: From Linear Models to Machine Learning. Chapman and Hall/CRC. ISBN 9781498710916.
- Matloff, Norman (2019). Probability and Statistics for Data Science: Math + R + Data. Chapman and Hall/CRC. ISBN 9781138393295.
- Matloff, Norman (2023). The Art of Machine Learning: A Hands-On Guide to Machine Learning with R. No Starch Press. ISBN 9781718502109.
