= Karen Porter =

American ecologist

- Born: Karen Glaus
- Education: Yale University
- Scientific career
- Fields: Aquatic ecology
- Workplaces: University of Georgia, University of Michigan
- Thesis: The selective effects of grazing by zooplankton on the phytoplankton of Fuller Pond, Kent, Connecticut (1973)
- Doctoral advisor: G. Evelyn Hutchinson

Karen Glaus Porter is professor emerita at the University of Georgia who is known for her work on aquatic ecology, particularly on the ecology of small organisms such as bacteria and protozoa.

== Education and career ==
Porter completed her doctoral research at Yale University in 1973 where she was a student of G. Evelyn Hutchinson. After finishing her Ph.D., she moved to a tenure-track position at the University of Michigan. She later moved to the University of Georgia as an associate professor. As of 2026 Porter is professor emerita at the University of Georgia.

== Research ==
Porter is known for her research on aquatic ecology. Her early research developed the stains needed to stain bacterial cells, which was the most highly-cited paper in Limnology and Oceanography as of 2005. She later shifted her focus to field research, where she focused on small organisms in aquatic food webs. As part of her research, Porter found evidence of multi-celled fossils in rocks dating to the Middle Cambrian to early Proterozoic periods.

== Selected publications ==
- Porter, Karen G. (1973). "Selective Grazing and Differential Digestion of Algae by Zooplankton". Nature. 244 (5412): 179–180. Bibcode:1973Natur.244..179P. doi:10.1038/244179a0. ISSN 0028-0836.
- Porter, Karen G.; Pace, Michael L.; Battey, James F. (1979). "Ciliate protozoans as links in freshwater planktonic food chains". Nature. 277 (5697): 563–565. Bibcode:1979Natur.277..563P. doi:10.1038/277563a0. ISSN 0028-0836.
- Porter, Karen G.; Feig, Yvette S. (1980). "The use of DAPI for identifying and counting aquatic microflora". Limnology and Oceanography. 25 (5): 943–948. Bibcode:1980LimOc..25..943P. doi:10.4319/lo.1980.25.5.0943. ISSN 0024-3590.
- Gerritsen, Jeroen; Porter, Karen G. (1982-06-11). "The Role of Surface Chemistry in Filter Feeding by Zooplankton". Science. 216 (4551): 1225–1227. Bibcode:1982Sci...216.1225G. doi:10.1126/science.216.4551.1225. ISSN 0036-8075. PMID 17830583.
- Porter, James W.; Porter, Karen G., eds. (2002). "The Everglades, Florida Bay, and coral reefs of the Florida Keys : an ecosystem sourcebook". search.worldcat.org. OCLC 46959847.
