= F. Eugene Yates =

American physiologist (1927–2015)

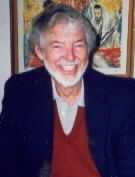
- Born: Francis Eugene Yates; February 26, 1927; Eagle Rock, California, U.S.
- Died: January 20, 2015 (aged 87); Los Angeles, California, U.S.
- Education: University of Texas at Austin; Harvard Medical School; Stanford Medical School
- Known for: homeodynamics
- Spouse(s): Margaret Barnett (1949-2015; his death; 5 children)
- Scientific career
- Fields: Physiology and Medical Engineering
- Workplaces: Harvard University; Stanford Medical School; University of Southern California; University of California Los Angeles

Francis Eugene Yates (February 26, 1927 – January 20, 2015) was an American physiologist and a professor of medicine and medical engineering at University of California Los Angeles.

== Biography ==
Eugene Yates was born in Eagle Rock, California. During World War II, Yates was in the U.S. Navy as a medical officer and attended University of Texas (Austin). He attended UCLA from 1945 to 1946. He attended Harvard Medical School from 1946 to 1950, where he received an MD degree. He served in the Korean War in Guam in 1951–1953 and then went on to Stanford Medical School from 1960 to 1970.

Yates married Margaret Barnett Yates, MD in 1949. They had five children, Katherine K. Yates, Gregory B. Yates, Peter F. Yates, Eugene B. Yates, and Anna S. Yates.

His death was failure to thrive from a fracture that resulted from having fallen off his exercise bike in Pacific Palisades, California.

== Work ==
Yates worked at Harvard University in the Dept. Physiology from 1953 to 1960. He was at Stanford Medical School, Physiology Dept. 1960-1970. He was at University of Southern California as the Biomedical Engineering Center executive director from 1969 to 1980. From 1980 to 2001, Yates had a joint appointment at UCLA as professor of medicine and professor of chemical engineering. He was the first holder of endowed chair, The Ralph and Marjorie Crump Professorship of Medical Engineering from 1980 to 1988. In 2002, Yates was the professor of geriatric medical research, emeritus at Department of Medicine, UCLA. He retired in 2003.

Yates was a consulting principal scientist at the ALZA Pharmaceutical Company from 1969 to 1997. He was on the external advisory council of NASA-affiliated National Space Biomedical Research Inst. Houston, Texas for seven years. He worked as a science advisor to the John Douglas French Alzheimer’s Foundation in 2003. He was also a member of scientific advisory board for Dakim, Inc.

== Contributions ==
Yates coined scientific terms including homeodynamics, pharmacolinguistics, pharmacosemiotics.

Yates’ career has included investigations that have been experimental, clinical, and theoretical in congestive heart failure, hypothalamic-pituitary-adrenal-cortical feedback systems, computer modeling of endocrine and metabolic systems, biology especially in regard to self-organizing systems, aging, temporal organization of living systems, and circadian rhythms.

He served on advisory panels for NIH, NSF, FDA, NASA, and FASEB. Yates was a founding member and past president of the Biomedical Engineering Society. He was on publications committees for the three societies he founded new scientific journals (AJP: Regulatory, Integrative and Comparative Physiology for the American Physiological Society; Annals of Biomedical Engineering for the Biomedical Engineering Society; and Endocrine Reviews for the Endocrine Society).

Yates also organized three major international conferences, one on self-organizing systems in 1979 supported by the Ripple Foundation, AIBS (NAS) in Dubrovnik, Yugoslavia; nonlinearities in brain function in Santa Barbara, California, in 1982 supported by the Kroc Foundation; and chemically based computer design in 1983 supported by NSF.

== Honors ==
- American Physiological Society Living History
- Markle Scholar in Medical Science (Harvard and Stanford),
- Fellow, American Association for the Advancement of Science
- Centennial Scholar of Johns Hopkins University
- Distinguished Service Award by BMES, 2000
- the first lecturer at the University of Connecticut in the endowed series honoring the life and work of Arthur Iberall, entitled “Life and the Sciences of Complexity.”

== Patents ==
- Controlled transdermal administration of melatonin, (1996).

== Publications ==
=== Books ===
- 1987. Yates, F. Eugene (Ed.), Self-Organizing Systems, The Emergence of Order, New York, Plenum Press, ISBN 978-1-4613-0883-6.
- 2012. Yates, F.E. (Ed.), Self-Organizing Systems, The Emergence of Order. Springer Science & Business Media.
