= Social physics =

Science that understands human crowds

Social physics or sociophysics is an interdisciplinary field of science which uses mathematical tools inspired by physics to understand the behavior of human crowds. In a modern commercial use, it can also refer to the analysis of social phenomena with big data.

Social physics is closely related to econophysics, which uses physics methods to describe economics.

== History ==
The earliest mentions of a concept of social physics began with the English philosopher Thomas Hobbes. In 1636 he traveled to Florence, Italy, and met physicist-astronomer Galileo Galilei, known for his contributions to the study of motion. It was here that Hobbes began to outline the idea of representing the "physical phenomena" of society in terms of the laws of motion. In his treatise De Corpore, Hobbes sought to relate the movement of "material bodies" to the mathematical terms of motion outlined by Galileo and similar scientists of the time period. Although there was no explicit mention of "social physics", the sentiment of examining society with scientific methods began before the first written mention of social physics.

Later, French social thinker Henri de Saint-Simon's first book, the 1803 Lettres d'un Habitant de Geneve, introduced the idea of describing society using laws similar to those of the physical and biological sciences. His student and collaborator was Auguste Comte, a French philosopher widely regarded as the founder of sociology, who first defined the term in an essay appearing in Le Producteur, a journal project by Saint-Simon. Comte defined social physics:

Social physics is that science which occupies itself with social phenomena, considered in the same light as astronomical, physical, chemical, and physiological phenomena, that is to say as being subject to natural and invariable laws, the discovery of which is the special object of its researches.

After Saint-Simon and Comte, Belgian statistician Adolphe Quetelet, proposed that society be modeled using mathematical probability and social statistics. Quetelet's 1835 book, Essay on Social Physics: Man and the Development of his Faculties, outlines the project of a social physics characterized by measured variables that follow a normal distribution, and collected data about many such variables. A frequently repeated anecdote is that when Comte discovered that Quetelet had appropriated the term "social physics", he found it necessary to invent a new term, "sociologie" ("sociology") because he disagreed with Quetelet's collection of statistics.

There have been several "generations" of social physicists. The first generation began with Saint-Simon, Comte, and Quetelet, and ended with the late 1800s with historian Henry Adams. In the middle of the 20th century, researchers such as the American astrophysicist John Q. Stewart and Finnish geographer Reino Ajo, who showed that the spatial distribution of social interactions could be described using gravity models. Physicists such as Arthur Iberall use a homeokinetics approach to study social systems as complex self-organizing systems. For example, a homeokinetics analysis of society shows that one must account for flow variables such as the flow of energy, of materials, of action, reproduction rate, and value-in-exchange. More recently there have been a large number of social science papers that use mathematics broadly similar to that of physics, and described as "computational social science".

In the late 1800s, Adams separated "human physics" into the subsets of social physics or social mechanics (sociology of interactions using physics-like mathematical tools) and social thermodynamics or sociophysics (sociology described using mathematical invariances similar to those in thermodynamics). This dichotomy is roughly analogous to the difference between microeconomics and macroeconomics.

== Examples ==
=== Ising model and voter dynamics ===
A 5x5 representational grid of an Ising model. Each space holds a spin and the red bars indicate communication between neighbors.

One of the most well-known examples in social physics is the relationship of the Ising model and the voting dynamics of a finite population. The Ising model, as a model of ferromagnetism, is represented by a grid of spaces, each of which is occupied by a spin, numerically ±1. Mathematically, the final energy state of the system depends on the interactions of the spaces and their respective spins. For example, if two adjacent spaces share the same spin, the surrounding neighbors will begin to align, and the system will eventually reach a state of consensus. In social physics, it has been observed that voter dynamics in a finite population obey the same mathematical properties of the Ising model. In the social physics model, each spin denotes an opinion, e.g. yes or no, and each space represents a "voter". If two adjacent spaces (voters) share the same spin (opinion), their neighbors begin to align with their spin value; if two adjacent spaces do not share the same spin, then their neighbors remain the same. Eventually, the remaining voters will reach a state of consensus as the "information flows outward".

Example of social validation in the Sznajd model. If two neighbors agree (top), then their neighbors agree with them. If two neighbors disagree (bottom), their neighbors begin to disagree as well.

The Sznajd model is an extension of the Ising model and is classified as an econophysics model. It emphasizes the alignment of the neighboring spins in a phenomenon called "social validation". It follows the same properties as the Ising model and is extended to observe the patterns of opinion dynamics as a whole, rather than focusing on just voter dynamics.

=== Potts model and cultural dynamics ===
The Potts model is a generalization of the Ising model and has been used to examine the concept of cultural dissemination as described by American political scientist Robert Axelrod. Axelrod's model of cultural dissemination states that individuals who share cultural characteristics are more likely to interact with each other, thus increasing the number of overlapping characteristics and expanding their interaction network. The Potts model has the caveat that each spin can hold multiple values, unlike the Ising model that could only hold one value. Each spin, then, represents an individual's "cultural characteristics... [or] in Axelrod's words, 'the set of individual attributes that are subject to social influence'". It is observed that, using the mathematical properties of the Potts model, neighbors whose cultural characteristics overlap tend to interact more frequently than with unlike neighbors, thus leading to a self-organizing grouping of similar characteristics. Simulations done on the Potts model both show Axelrod's model of cultural dissemination agrees with the Potts model as an Ising-class model.

== Recent work ==
In modern use "social physics" refers to using "big data" analysis and the mathematical laws to understand the behavior of human crowds. The core idea is that data about human activity (e.g., phone call records, credit card purchases, taxi rides, web activity) contain mathematical patterns that are characteristic of how social interactions spread and converge. These mathematical invariances can then serve as a filter for analysis of behavior changes and for detecting emerging behavioral patterns.

Social physics has recently been applied to analyze the COVID-19 pandemics. It has been demonstrated that the large difference in the spread of COVID-19 between countries is due to differences in responses to social stress. The combination of traditional epidemic models with social physics models of the classical general adaptation syndrome triad, "anxiety-resistance-exhaustion", accurately describes the first two waves of the COVID-19 epidemic for 13 countries. The differences between countries are concentrated in two kinetic constants: the rate of mobilization and the rate of exhaustion.

Recent books about social physics include MIT Professor Alex Pentland's book Social Physics or Nature editor Mark Buchanan's book The Social Atom. Popular reading about sociophysics include English physicist Philip Ball's Why Society is a Complex Matter, Dirk Helbing's The Automation of Society is next or American Hungarian physicist Laszlo Barabasi's book Linked.

== See also ==
- Gravity model of migration
- Historical recurrence
- Social organism
