= Artificial Organs (journal) =

- Discipline: Biomedical engineering, organ transplantation
- Language: English
- Edited by: Vaktang Tchantchaleishvili

Publication details
- History: 1977–present
- Publisher: Wiley on behalf of the International Center for Artificial Organs and Transplantation
- Frequency: Monthly
- Open access: Hybrid
- Impact factor: 3.094 (2020)

Standard abbreviations
- ISO 4: Artif. Organs

Indexing
- CODEN: ARORD7
- ISSN: 0160-564X (print); 1525-1594 (web)
- LCCN: 78640817
- OCLC no.: 03695286

Links
- Journal homepage; Online access; Online archive

Artificial Organs is a monthly peer-reviewed biomedical journal that covers organ replacement technology published by Wiley. It was established in 1977 by Yukihiko Nosé and Paul S. Malchesky, and was originally edited by Willem J. Kolff. The current editor-in-chief is Vakhtang Tchantchaleishvili.

It is the official journal of several organizations, including the International Federation for Artificial Organs, the International Society for Mechanical Circulatory Support, and the International Functional Electrical Stimulation Society.

== History ==
The journal was established in 1977 as the official publication of the newly formed International Society for Artificial Organs (ISAO), a precursor of the International Federation for Artificial Organs. In 1979, the International Center for Artificial Organs and Transplantation (ICAOT) was established with Artificial Organs serving as one of its publishing arms. Over time, the journal became the official publication of several organizations in the field of organ replacement, recovery, and regeneration, with ICAOT functioning as its parent entity. The journal was published by ISAO from 1977 to 1982. Subsequently, publishing was taken over by Raven Press from 1983 to 1991, Blackwell Scientific Publications from 1992 to 2008, Wiley-Blackwell from 2008 to 2013, and Wiley from 2014 to the present.

== Editors-in-chief ==
The following persons are or have been editor-in-chief:

- Willem J. Kolff (1977–1982)
- Yukihiko Nosé (1983–1999)
- Paul S. Malchesky (2000–2020)
- Vakhtang Tchantchaleishvili (2021–present)

== Affiliate organizations ==
The following organizations are affiliated with the journal:

- European Kidney Health Alliance
- European Mechanical Circulatory Support Society
- International Faculty of Artificial Organs
- International Federation for Artificial Organs, which includes:
  - American Society for Artificial Internal Organs
  - European Society for Artificial Organs
  - Japanese Society for Artificial Organs
- International Functional Electrical Stimulation Society
- International Society for Mechanical Circulatory Support
- Vienna International Workshop on Functional Electrical Stimulation

== Abstracting and indexing ==
The journal is abstracted and indexed in the following bibliographic databases:

- Biological Abstracts
- BIOSIS Previews
- CAB Abstracts
- Chemical Abstracts Service
- Current Contents/Clinical Medicine
- EBSCO databases
- Embase
- Index Medicus/MEDLINE/PubMed
- ProQuest databases
- Science Citation Index Expanded
- Scopus

According to the Journal Citation Reports, the journal has a 2020 impact factor of 3.094.
