= Dava Newman =

American aerospace engineer (born 1964)

Dava J. Newman
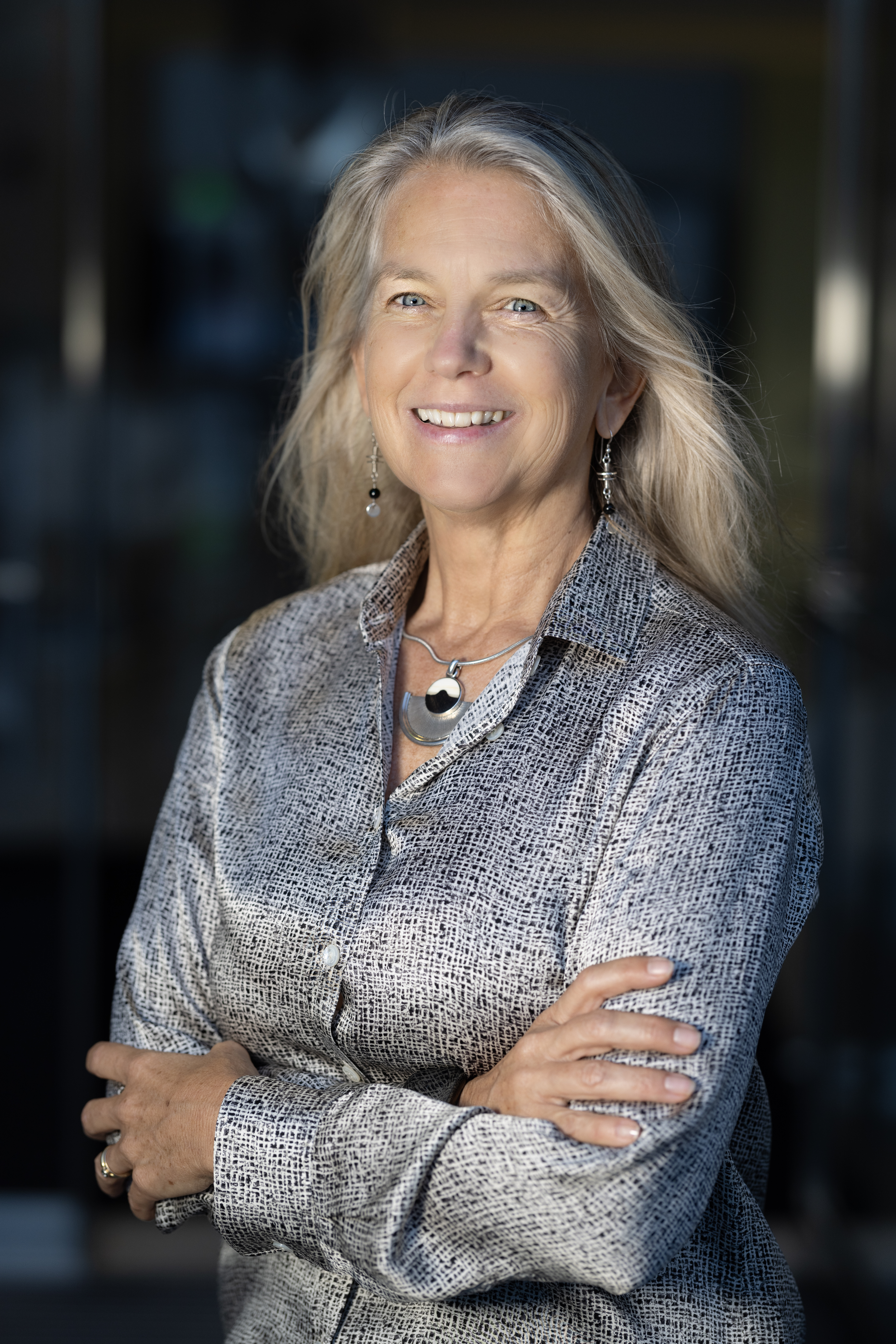
- Newman in October 2023

13th Deputy Administrator of the National Aeronautics and Space Administration
- In office May 15, 2015 – January 20, 2017
- President: Barack Obama
- Preceded by: Lori Garver
- Succeeded by: James Morhard

Personal details
- Born: 1964 (age 61–62) Helena, Montana
- Spouse: Guillermo Trotti
- Education: University of Notre Dame (BS, 1986); Massachusetts Institute of Technology (dual SM, 1989; PhD, 1992)

Dava Jean Newman (born 1964) is an American aerospace engineer. She is the former director of the MIT Media Lab and a former deputy administrator of NASA. Newman is the Apollo Program Professor of Aeronautics and Astronautics and Engineering Systems at the Massachusetts Institute of Technology. She has been a faculty member in the department of Aeronautics and Astronautics and MIT's School of Engineering since 1993.

Newman earned her PhD in aerospace biomedical engineering, and Master of Science degrees in aerospace engineering and technology and policy all from MIT, and her Bachelor of Science degree in aerospace engineering from the University of Notre Dame. She is a member of the faculty at the Harvard–MIT Program in Health Sciences and Technology and a MacVicar Faculty Fellow. She formerly directed the Technology and Policy Program at MIT (2003–2015) and the MIT Portugal Program since 2011.

== Research ==
Newman's research expertise is in aerospace biomedical engineering, investigating human performance in varying gravity environments. Newman was the principal investigator on four spaceflight missions. The Space Shuttle Dynamic Load Sensors (DLS) experiment measured astronaut-induced disturbances of the microgravity environment on the STS-62 mission. The Enhanced Dynamic Load Sensors experiment flew on board the Mir Space Station from 1996–1998. Newman was a Co-Investigator on the Mental Workload and Performance Experiment (MWPE) that flew on STS-42 to measure astronaut mental workload and fine motor control in microgravity. She also developed the MICR0-G space flight experiment to provide a sensor suite and study human adaptation in extreme environments. She was the MIT Principal Investigator on the Gravity Loading Countermeasure Suit, or Skinsuit, which flew the International Space Station as an ESA technology demonstration from 2015 to 2017.

Newman has promoted the development of space activity suits, namely the Bio-Suit, which provides pressure through compression directly on the skin via the suit's textile weave, patterning, and advanced materials rather than with pressurized gas. The suit is designed to help astronauts move around more easily than gas-filled suits allow. These spacesuit technologies are applied to "soft suits" to study and enhance locomotion on Earth including addressing problems with medical mobility and rehabilitation. Newman is the author of Interactive Aerospace Engineering and Design, an introductory engineering textbook, has published more than 300 papers in journals and refereed conferences, and holds numerous compression technology patents.

== NASA deputy administratorship ==
In October 2014, Newman was nominated by President Barack Obama as deputy administrator of NASA, but the U.S. Senate returned the nomination to the president in December 2014 when the 113th Congress adjourned without having confirmed her for the position. Under Senate rules, in order for Newman to be confirmed, Obama needed to re-nominate her to the Senate of the 114th Congress, and he did so on January 8, 2015. Her confirmation hearing before the Senate Committee on Commerce, Science and Transportation was held March 25, 2015, and the committee unanimously recommended approval by the full Senate. She was confirmed by the Senate on April 27, 2015. She resigned the position upon the end of the Obama administration on January 20, 2017.

== Honors ==
Select honors include named among World's Most Influential Women Engineers (2021), Lowell Thomas Award (Explorer's Club (2018), the NASA Distinguished Service Medal (2017), Women in Aerospace Leadership Award (2017), and the Aerospace Medical Association's Henry L. Taylor Award for Outstanding Accomplishment in Aerospace Human Factors (2017).

Newman's BioSuit spacesuit system has been exhibited at the Venice Biennial (2015), the American Museum of Natural History (2012), the Victoria and Albert and Museum, London (2012), the Paris City Museum of Science and Industry (2010), the London Museum of Science and Industry (2009), and the Metropolitan Museum of Art (2008).

Newman was awarded Best Invention of 2007 by Time magazine, named one of the 100 Extraordinary Women Engineers in 2004, and received the Women in Aerospace National Aerospace Educator Award (2001).

Newman is a former housemaster of MIT's Baker House.

== Partial bibliography ==
- Newman, D.J., Interactive Aerospace Engineering and Design, introductory engineering textbook with accompanying interactive CD-ROM, McGraw-Hill, Inc., January 2002. ISBN 978-0072348200
- Saleh, J.H., Hastings, D.E., and D.J. Newman, "Weaving Time into System Architecture: Satellite Cost per Operational Day and Optimal Design Lifetime", Acta Astronautica, 54:413-431, 2004.
- Ferguson, P. A., Krebs, C. P., Stirling, L. A., Newman, D. J., "Kinetic and Kinematic Sensing System for the MICRO-G /Adapt International Space Station Experiment", IEEE Transactions on Instrumentation and Measurement, June, 2006.
- Jordan, N. C., Saleh, J. H., Newman, D. J., "The extravehicular mobility unit: A review of environment, requirements, and design changes in the US spacesuit", Acta Astronautica, Volume 59, Issue 12, Pages 1135-1145, July 2006.
- Newman, D.J., Canina, M. Trotti, G.L., "Revolutionary Design for Astronaut Exploration – Beyond the Bio-Suit", CP880, Space Technology and Applications International Forum—STAIF-2007, Albuquerque, NM, February 11–15, 2007.
- Carr, C. E., Newman, D. J., "Space Suit Bioenergetics: Framework and Analysis of Unsuited and Suited Activity", Aviation, Space, and Environmental Medicine, 78:1013-1022, 2007.
- Johnson, A.W., Hoffman, J.A., Newman, D.J., Mazarico, E.M., and Zuber, M.T., "An Integrated Traverse Planner and Analysis Tool for Future Planetary Exploration", AIAA 2010-8829, SPACE 2010, Anaheim, CA, 2010.
- Stirling, L., Newman, D.J., Willcox, K., "Self-Rotations in Simulated Microgravity: Performance Effects of Strategy Training" Aviation, Space, and Environmental Medicine, vol. 80 no. 1, pp. 5–14, 2009.
- Stirling, L., Willcox, K., Newman, D., "Development of a Computational Model for Astronaut Reorientation", Journal of Biomechanics, Vol. 43, Issue 12, pp. 2309–2314, August 2010.
- R. A. Opperman, J. M. Waldie, A. Natapoff, D. J. Newman, J. A. Jones, "Probability of Spacesuit-Induced Fingernail Trauma is associated with Hand Circumference", Aviation, Space, and Environmental Medicine, 81, 907-913, 2010.
- Wagner, E.B., Granzella, N.P., Saito, N., Newman, D.J., Young, L.R., Bouxsein, M.L., "Partial weight Suspension: A Novel Murine Model for Investigation Adaptation to Reduce Musculoskeletal Loading", Journal of Applied Physiology, 109:350-357, 2010.
- Waldie, J., Newman, D., "A Gravity Loading Countermeasure Skinsuit", Acta Astronautica, 68(7-8):722-730, 2011.
- Pfotenhauer, Sebastian M., et al. "Seeding Change through International University Partnerships: The MIT-Portugal Program as a Driver of Internationalization, Networking, and Innovation", Higher Education Policy, 2012.
- Wessendorf, A.M. and Newman, D.J., Dynamic Understanding of Human-Skin Movement and Strain-Field Analysis, IEEE Transactions on Biomedical Engineering, 59(12):3432-3438, 2012.
- Duda, K., Vasquez, R., Newman, D.J., "Variable Vector Countermeasure Suit (V2Suit) for Space Exploration", IEEE Explore, ISBN 978-1-4673-1813-6, 2013.
- Holschuh, B., Obropta, E., Newman, D.J., "Low Spring Index NiTi Coil Actuators for Use in Active Compression Garments, IEEE/ASME Transactions on Mechatronics, 20(3):1264-1277, 2015.
- Melo, P., Silva, M., Martins, J., and Newman, D.J., "Technical Developments of Functional Electrical Stimulation to Correct Drop Foot: Sensing, Actuation and Control Strategies", Clinical Biomechanics, 30(2):101-113, 2015.
- Holschuh, B., and Newman, D. "Two-Spring Model for Active Compression Textiles with Integrated NiTi Coil Actuators", Smart Materials and Structures, 24, 2015.
- Anderson, Y. Menguc, R. Wood, D. Newman, "Development of the Polipo Pressure Sensing System for Dynamic Space-Suited Motion", IEEE Sensors Journal, Vol. 15(11):6229-6237, 2015.
- P. L. Melo, M. T. Silva, J. M. Martins, D. J. Newman, "A Microcontroller Platform for The Rapid Prototyping of Functional Electrical Stimulation (FES)-based Gait Neuroprostheses", Artificial Organs, 39(5):E56-66, May 2015.
- B Holschuh, D Newman, "Morphing Compression Garments for Space Medicine and Extravehicular Activity Using Active Materials", Aerospace Medicine and Human Performance 87 (2), 84-92, 2016.
- Newman, D.J., Wood, D., Roos, D., Pfotenhauer., S., "Architecting complex international science, technology and innovation partnerships (CISTIPs): A study of four global MIT collaborations", Technological Forecasting and Social Change, Volume 104, March 2016, Pages 38–56.
- Wood, D. and Newman, D. "The Innovation Landscape within a Large Government Agency: Promising Practices from the US National Aeronautics and Space Administration (NASA)", 67th International Astronautical Congress, Guadalajara, Mexico, Sept. 2016.
- Anandapadmanaban, E., Tannady, J., Norheim, J., Newman, D., and Hoffman, J., "Holo-SEXTANT: an Augmented Reality Planetary EVA Navigation Interface", 48th International Conference on Environmental Systems, Albuquerque, New Mexico, July 2018.
- Ekblaw, A., Prosina, A., Newman, D.J., and Paradiso, J., "Space Habitat Reconfigurability: TESSERAE platform for self-aware assembly", 30th IAA Symposium On Space and Society (Space Architecture: Habitats, Habitability, and Bases). Proceedings of the IAF International Astronautical Congress, 2019.
- Kenza Amara, David Dao, Björn Lütjens, Dava Newman, Tom Crowther, and Ce Zhang. 2020. "OneForest: Towards a Global Species Dataset by Fusing Remote Sensing and Citizen Science Data with Graph Neural Networks". In Proceedings of KDD 2020 Virtual Conference (KDD2020). ACM, New York, NY, US.
- Lütjens, B., Leshchinskiy, B., Requena-Mesa, C.*, Chishtie, F., Diaz-Rodriguez, N., Boulais, O., Pi a, A., Newman, D., Lavin A., Gal Y., Raissi, C (2020) "Physics-Informed GANs for Coastal Flood Visualization", *equal contribution, in review at NeurIPS workshop on Tackling Climate Change with AI, demo at trillium.tech/eie
- Lütjens, B., Veillette, M., Newman, D., "Uncertainty-Aware Physics-Informed Neural Networks for Parametrizations in Ocean Modeling", AGU Annual Mtg., 2020.
- Abitante, T., Bouxsein, M., Duda, K., Newman, D. "Potential of Neuromuscular Electrical Stimulation as a Bone Loss Countermeasure in Microgravity. aerosp med hum perform. 2022;93(11)
