= Danielle Wood (engineer) =

American engineer

Danielle Renee Wood
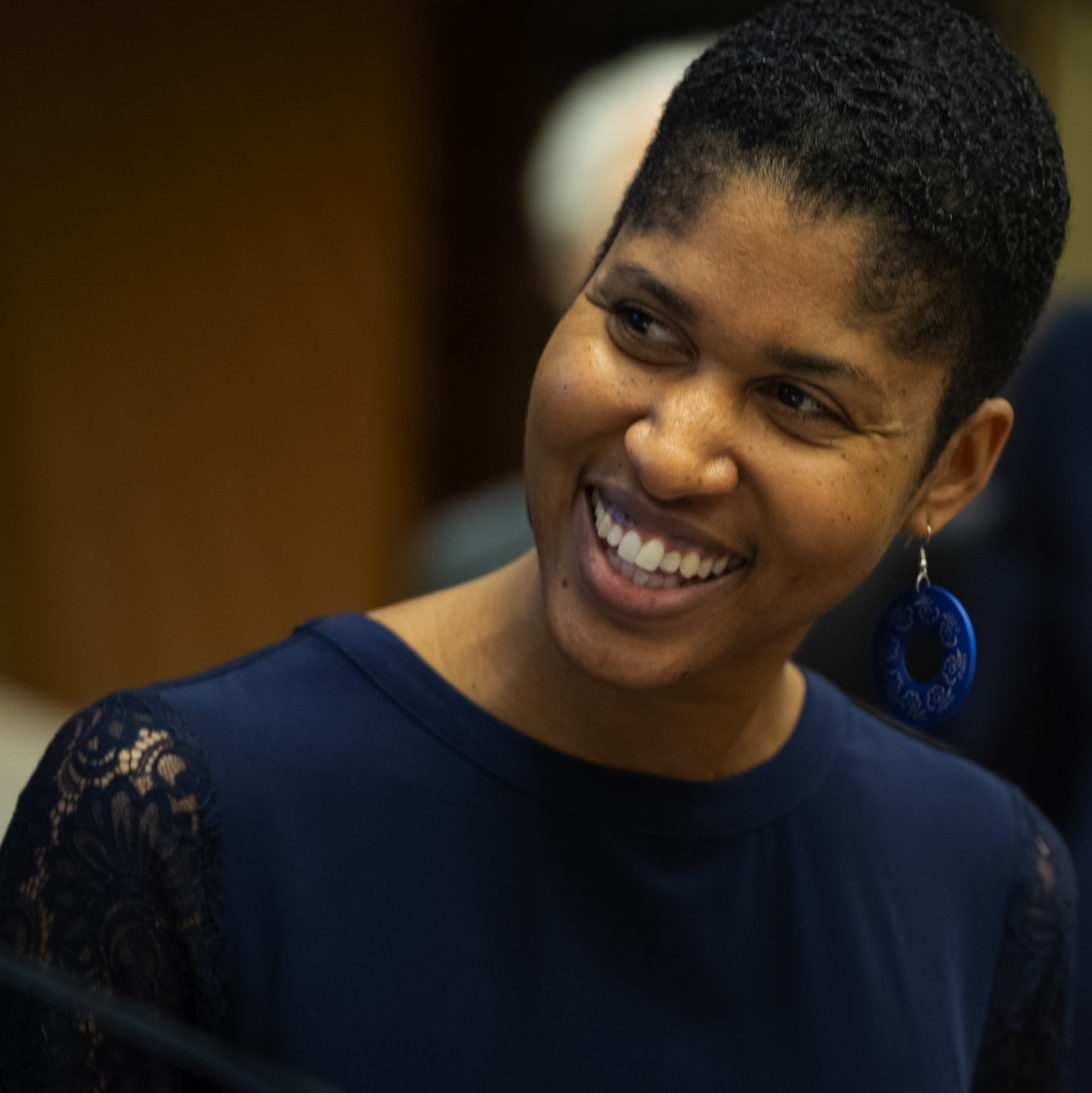
- Wood in 2019
- Born: Orlando, Florida
- Education: Massachusetts Institute of Technology
- Known for: Space policy
- Scientific career
- Workplaces: MIT Media Lab; Johns Hopkins University
- Thesis: Building technological capability within satellite programs in developing countries (2012)
- Doctoral advisor: Annalisa Weigel

Danielle Wood is an associate professor in the MIT Media Lab, where she directs the research group Space Enabled. Prior to joining MIT, Wood worked as special assistant to Dava Newman at NASA. Wood looks to advance justice using technology created in space.

== Early life and education ==
Wood was born in Orlando, Florida. She was inspired to work in the space sector by the shuttle launches that she watched as a child, including the launch of the first woman space commander Eileen Collins. She was a high school intern at the Kennedy Space Center, where she worked with the logistics branch of the International Space Station. She watched the launch of the Chandra X-ray Observatory. During breaks from college she worked as a volunteer in Kenya, where she taught maths and science for girls who lived in slums. She earned her Master of Science degree at MIT in 2008. During her undergraduate degree she was part of the MIT-NASA project Synchronized Position Hold Engage and Reorient Experimental Satellite (SPHERES). Wood attended the NASA Institute for Advanced Concepts conference in 2004, presenting her work on space-based solar power. She attended her first International Astronautical Congress in South Korea in 2008, and became involved with the International Astronautical Federation. She remained at MIT for her doctoral studies, working in the Engineering Systems Division on aerospace engineering and technology policy. She researched satellite technologies in the developing world. Her doctorate included an investigation into satellites in Africa, Asia and the Middle East. She earned her PhD in 2012 and worked as an intern at the Goddard Space Flight Center.

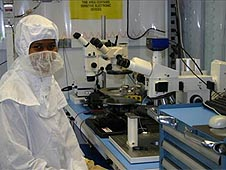
Wood in a clean room suit at Goddard's Laboratory for High Energy Astrophysics in 2004

Wood used her internship to look at how NASA spinoff technologies could be used to benefit the developing world in fulfilling the Sustainable Development Goals. She joined Johns Hopkins University Applied Physics Laboratory as a postdoctoral fellow in 2013. Her research looked at how engineering and policy could be used to study socio-technical systems, and co-led a National Science Foundation project Technology, Collaboration, and Learning: Modelling Complex International Innovation Partnerships.

== Research and career ==
In 2015 Wood joined NASA Headquarters as special assistant to Dava Newman. She provided technical advice on space exploration, education and innovation. She explored emerging technologies for earth observation in the United States and Developing World. She worked with historically black colleges and universities to secure federal sponsorship from NASA.

Wood was appointed to the MIT Media Lab in 2018, where she leads the Space Enabled laboratory. She is the first black woman professor at the MIT Media Lab. Wood believes that space technology can be used to help society; for example satellite communication and positioning to help in disasters. Her research group align their aims with the Sustainable Development Goals. They are working on ways to design satellites for social applications and making sustainable spacecraft. In April 2018 the group visited Africa, visiting Ghana and the Benin Republic.

=== Public engagement and advocacy ===
In February 2018 Wood delivered a TED Talk, 6 space technologies we can use to improve life on Earth, which has been viewed over 1 million times. She was featured in the NASA series celebrating Black History Month. Wood delivered a keynote at the first MIT-Africa forum in November 2018. Wood is an advisor on the Brooke Owens Fellowship. She was added to The Guardian's Frederick Douglass 200 list, a list of activists organising and speaking out against injustice, in 2018. In 2021, Wood was selected as a Bloomberg New Economy Catalyst. As part of the program, she attended the annual New Economy Forum held in Singapore, and the Bloomberg New Economy Catalyst Retreat that same year.
