= Contact process (mathematics) =

The contact process (on a 1-D lattice): Active sites are indicated by grey circles and inactive sites by dotted circles. Active sites can activate inactive sites to either side of them at a rate r/2 or become inactive at rate 1.

The contact process is a stochastic process used to model population growth on the set of sites $S$ of a graph in which occupied sites become vacant at a constant rate, while vacant sites become occupied at a rate proportional to the number of occupied neighboring sites. Therefore, if we denote by $\lambda$ the proportionality constant, each site remains occupied for a random time period which is exponentially distributed parameter 1 and places descendants at every vacant neighboring site at times of events of a Poisson process parameter $\lambda$ during this period. All processes are independent of one another and of the random period of time sites remains occupied. The contact process can also be interpreted as a model for the spread of an infection by thinking of particles as a bacterium spreading over individuals that are positioned at the sites of $S$, occupied sites correspond to infected individuals, whereas vacant correspond to healthy ones.

The main quantity of interest is the number of particles in the process, say $N_{t}$, in the first interpretation, which corresponds to the number of infected sites in the second one. Therefore, the process survives whenever the number of particles is positive for all times, which corresponds to the case that there are always infected individuals in the second one. For any infinite graph $S$ there exists a positive and finite critical value $\lambda_c$ so that if $\lambda>\lambda_c$ then survival of the process starting from a finite number of particles occurs with positive probability, while if $\lambda<\lambda_c$ their extinction is almost certain. Note that by reductio ad absurdum and the infinite monkey theorem, survival of the process is equivalent to $N_{t}\to\infty$, as $t\to\infty$, whereas extinction is equivalent to $N_{t}\to 0$, as $t\to\infty$, and therefore, it is natural to ask about the rate at which $N_{t}\to\infty$ when the process survives.

== Mathematical definition ==
If the state of the process at time $t$ is $\xi_{t}$, then a site $x$ in $S$ is occupied, say by a particle, if $\xi_{t}(x)=1$ and vacant if $\xi_{t}(x)=0$. The contact process is a continuous-time Markov process with state space $\{0,1\}^S$, where $S$ is a finite or countable graph, usually $\mathbb{Z}^d$, and a special case of an interacting particle system. More specifically, the dynamics of the basic contact process is defined by the following transition rates: at site $x$,

$$1\rightarrow0\quad\text{at rate }1,$$
$$0\rightarrow1\quad\text{at rate }\lambda\sum_{y\,:\,y\,\sim\,x}\xi_{t}(y),$$

where the sum is over all the neighbors $y$ of $x$ in $S$. This means that each site waits an exponential time with the corresponding rate, and then flips (so 0 becomes 1 and vice versa).

== Connection to percolation ==
The contact process is a stochastic process that is closely connected to percolation theory. Ted Harris (1974) noted that the contact process on $\mathbb{Z}^d$ when infections and recoveries can occur only in discrete times $\{1,2, \ldots, \}$ corresponds to one-step-at-a-time bond percolation on the graph obtained by orienting each edge of $\mathbb{Z}^{d+1}$ in the direction of increasing coordinate-value.

== The law of large numbers on the integers ==
A law of large numbers for the number of particles in the process on the integers informally means that for all large $t$, $N_{t}$ is approximately equal to $c t$ for some positive constant $c= c(\lambda)$. Harris (1974) proved that, if the process survives, then the rate of growth of $N_{t}$ is at most and at least linear in time. A weak law of large numbers (that the process converges in probability) was shown by Durrett (1980). A few years later, Durrett and Griffeath (1983) improved this to a strong law of large numbers, giving almost sure convergence of the process.

== Die out at criticality ==
Contact processes on all integer lattices die out almost surely at the critical value.

== Durrett's conjecture and the central limit theorem ==
Durrett conjectured in survey papers and lecture notes during the 1980s and early 1990s regarding the central limit theorem for the Harris contact process, viz. that, if the process survives, then for all large $t$, $N_{t}$ equals $ct$ and the error equals $\sigma\sqrt t$ multiplied by a (random) error distributed according to a standard Gaussian distribution.

Durrett's conjecture turned out to be correct for a different value of $\sigma$ as proved in 2018.
