= Industrial Fasteners Institute =

- Abbreviation: IFI
- Formation: 1931
- Purpose: Trade and standards organization
- Headquarters: Independence, Ohio, United States
- Website: https://www.indfast.org

The Industrial Fasteners Institute (IFI) is an American non-profit trade and standards organization and publisher, based in Independence, Ohio. It was founded as the American Institute of Bolt, Nut and Rivet Manufacturers in 1931 and changed its name to the IFI in 1949. Among their publications is the frequently cited IFI Fastener Technology Handbook, a reference frequently used as a design guide by mechanical engineers, machinists, and others involved in the production of high-quality machine screws, bolts, nuts, and other engineered fasteners.

== Leadership ==
Herman H. Lind became the organization's executive vice president in 1937.

Frank Masterson was elected president of the institute by its 200 members in 1953 and assumed office in January 1954.

The organization's volunteer leadership for the 2026–27 term:

- Board Chair: Kevin Vollmert of ITW Shakeproof Automotive
- Vice-Chair: Devin Wilson of Parker Fasteners LLC
- Ex-Officio Chair: Larry Spelman, J.H. Botts, LLC

The organization's staff includes:

- Dan Walker, PE (Managing Director)
- Dr. Salim Brahimi, P.Eng (Director of Engineering & Technology)
- Laurence Claus (Director of Education & Training)
- Preston Boyd (Manager, Industrial Division)
- Mike Mowins (Manager, Aerospace Division)
- Mark Quebbeman (Manager, Automotive Industry Fastener Group)
- Maggie Mitchell (Manager, Membership & Meetings)
- Laurie Mueller (Office Manager)
- Daniel C. Urban (Legal Counsel)
- Jennifer Baker Reid (Washington Representative)

== Activities ==
The IFI has established industrial standards. One such standard is "IFI Standard 125", which concerns various forms of thread-locking fluid.

Most standards-compliant screws and fasteners that are used in the US are required to be marked, so that the manufacturer can be identified. The IFI maintains a list of trademarks and other identifying markers used by manufacturers.

It has sponsored scholarships for industrial design training at the Fastener Training Institute.

In 1946, the institute held its annual meeting in New York City and announced plans to request an increase in price ceilings on their industry's products from the Office of Price Administration.

In 1947, the institute criticized a War Assets Administration contract that sold 7.5 million dollars' worth of metal fasteners for $22.50 per ton to one nut and bolt company.

The institute played a role in debates about proposals for the United States to convert to the metric system. As of 1973, the IFI had 60 members, who reportedly produced 60 percent of the nuts, bolts, and screws manufactured in the United States. The organization initially opposed the U.S. conversion to metric measurements, but by 1973 had changed its position to support voluntary adoption of metric system standards without government interference, according to institute president Frank Masterson.

In 2012, Joe Greenslade, the technical director of the institute at the time, said he concured with an article in Physics World that "faulty rivets" may play a role in the sinking of Titanic.

== Related organizations ==
Related trade bodies for the fastener industry include the European Industrial Fasteners Institute (EIFI), Confederation of British Metalforming (CBM), The Fastener Institute of Japan (FIJ), Taiwan Industrial Fastener Institute (TIFI), Fastener Industry Coalition (FIC) USA, and Korea Federation of Fastener Industrial Cooperatives (KFFIC).

== Publications ==
- IFI Book of Fastener Standards (12th ed.). Industrial Fasteners Institute. 2024.
- IFI Fastener Manufacturer's Identification Binder. Industrial Fasteners Institute. 2021.
- TORQUE Book for Fasteners. Industrial Fasteners Institute. 2013.
- IFI Fastener Technology Handbook. Industrial Fasteners Institute. 2010. Educational resource.
- Test Application Handbook Relating to Mechanical Fasteners. Industrial Fasteners Institute. 1995.
- SPC Guide: Recommended Practices for Statistical Process Control. Industrial Fasteners Institute. 1991.
