= Candace A. Yano =

American social researcher

Academic background
- Education: Stanford University (Ph.D. (1981), M.S. (1980, 1979), A.B. (1977))

Academic work
- Discipline: Operations Research; Operations Management
- Institutions: University of California, Berkeley; University of Michigan
- Doctoral students: Alexandra Newman
- Awards: IIE Fellow; 2006; George E. Kimball Medal; 2008; INFORMS Fellow; 2014

Candace A.Yano is Professor and Chair at Haas School of Business's Operations and Information Technology Management Group, and Professor and former Head of Department of Industrial Engineering & Operations Research, both at University of California, Berkeley. She is also a senior technical consultant on operations management issues for Yano Accountancy Corporation (YAC).

== Academic work ==
Yano is known for her work in Inventory Theory, Logistics Management, Supply Chain Management, Service Management, Production-Quality Interface Issues, and Marketing-Production Interface Issues, and serves or has served on the editorial board of IIE Transactions, Interfaces, Management Science, Manufacturing & Service Operations Management, Naval Research Logistics, Operations Research, and Productions and Operations Management.

== Career ==
Prior to joining University of California, Berkeley, Yano was on the faculty at Department of Industrial & Operations Engineering, University of Michigan from 1983 to 1993, and served as a member of the technical staff at Bell Labs from 1981 to 1982.

== Awards ==
In 2006, Yano was named a Fellow of Institute of Industrial Engineers (IIE). As one of the earliest female scholars in the field of Operations Research, Yano received 2008 WORMS Award for the Advancement of Women in OR/MS. She is a past President of the Technical Section on Manufacturing Management of ORSA—which has evolved to today's MSOM Society—and won the MSOM Society's first Distinguished Service Award in 1997.

In 2014, Yano was elected as an INFORMS Fellow in honor of her lifetime achievement in Operations Research and the Management Sciences and in recognition of her role as "a leader in operations management research who has provided significant service to the field as program chair, editor, adviser, teacher, and mentor."

In 2018, Yano was awarded the George E. Kimball Medal in recognition of her service to INFORMS, and the field of Operations Research and Management Sciences.

In 2022, Yano was awarded the INFORMS President’s Award for her research contributions, teaching impact, and extensive INFORMS service.
