= Vicki Sauter =

American management scientist and systems engineer

Vicki Lynn Sauter (born 1955) is an American management scientist and systems engineer known for her books on decision support systems. She is a professor in the Information Systems and Technology Department at the University of Missouri–St. Louis.

== Education and career ==
Sauter grew up near Chicago; her father was murdered in an attempted robbery when she was a teenager, an event she cites as influential in her commitment to service.

She has a Ph.D. in systems engineering from Northwestern University, and serves on the advisory board for industrial engineering and management sciences at Northwestern. She joined the University of Missouri–St. Louis faculty in 1980. When she earned tenure there, she became the first woman in the College of Business Administration to do so.

Sauter is an avid collector of crafts, and in 2016 became president of the Craft Alliance Center of Art + Design in St. Louis. She also runs a museum at the University of Missouri–St. Louis honoring Grace Hopper.

== Books ==
Sauter's books include:

- Decision Support Systems: An Applied Managerial Approach (Wiley, 1997)
- Decision Support Systems For Business Intelligence (Wiley, 2010)

She is also the author of two self-published books, Street Lights of the World (2012) and You're Never Too Old To Surf: A Seniors' Guide to Safe Internet Use (2015).

== Recognition ==
Sauter is the 2003 winner of the George E. Kimball Medal of the Institute for Operations Research and the Management Sciences (INFORMS) for her service to the institute and particularly for her work in the merger of the two organizations ORSA and TIMS that together formed INFORMS. She became a Fellow of INFORMS in 2005. In 2012 she won the INFORMS WORMS Award for the Advancement of Women in OR/MS.

In 2013 the four-campus University of Missouri system gave Sauter the UM President's Award for University Citizenship.
