= Nahmias =

Nahmias is a surname. Notable people with the surname include:

- Aharon Nahmias (1932–1998), Israeli politician
- Alberto Nahmias (1905–1984), Greek football player
- Alysa Nahmias, American filmmaker
- Ayelet Nahmias-Verbin (born 1970), Israeli lawyer and politician
- David Nahmias (born 1964), American lawyer
- Hanny Nahmias (born 1959), Israeli actress
- Joseph ibn Naḥmias, 14th-century Jewish scholar of Toledo, Castile
- Steven Nahmias (born 1945), American author and professor of [operations management
- Yaakov Nahmias, Israeli biomedical engineer and entrepreneur
