= SBIR (disambiguation) =

SBIR is the Small Business Innovation Research program, an American research grant program

SBIR, SBIRS, or sbir may also refer to:

- Space-Based Infrared System, missile warning and defense system
- Speaker Boundary Interference Response, interaction of sound from loudspeakers with room boundaries due to speaker placement
- Sbir, village in South Sorong Regency, Indonesia

== See also ==
- SBIRT
- Sběř
