= Kathryn Stecke =

American industrial engineer

Kathryn Elizabeth Stecke is an American industrial engineer and management scientist known for her expertise in flexible manufacturing, supply chains, and seru, a Japanese production system based on using small groups of workers to assemble whole products instead of using assembly lines in which each worker handles only a small and repetitive sub-assembly task. She is a professor of operations management in the Naveen Jindal School of Management at the University of Texas at Dallas, where she holds the Naveen Jindal School Advisory Council Chair.

== Education and career ==
Stecke earned a bachelor's degree in mathematics from Boston State College in 1972. She went on to Purdue University for graduate study, where she earned a master's degree in applied mathematics in 1974, a second master's degree in industrial engineering in 1977, and a Ph.D. in industrial engineering in 1981. Her dissertation was Production planning problems for flexible manufacturing systems.

She joined the University of Michigan as an assistant professor in 1981, and became Jack D. Sparks/Whirlpool Corporation Research Professor at the University of Michigan in 1995. She moved to the University of Texas at Dallas in 2002, and was Ashbel Smith Professor of Operations Management at the University of Texas at Dallas from 2006 until 2018, when she was given the Naveen Jindal School Advisory Council Chair.

She was the founding editor-in-chief of two journals, the International Journal of Flexible Manufacturing Systems and Operations Management Education Review.

== Recognition ==
Stecke won an Alexander von Humboldt Foundation Fellowship in 1989. She was elected to the 2009 class of Fellows of the Institute for Operations Research and the Management Sciences. In 2017 she became a Fellow of the Production and Operations Management Society.

She is a 2007 winner of the INFORMS Distinguished Service Award, a 2008 winner of the INFORMS George E. Kimball Medal for recognition of distinguished service, and a 2013 winner of the INFORMS WORMS Award for the Advancement of Women in OR/MS. Purdue University gave her their 2014 Distinguished Women Scholars Award and their 2017 Outstanding Industrial Engineer Award.
