= Light of the World (disambiguation) =

Light of the World is a phrase used by Jesus to describe himself and his disciples in the New Testament.

Light of the World or The Light of the World may also refer to:

== Art ==
- The Light of the World (Boucher), a 1750 painting by François Boucher
- The Light of the World (Hunt), an 1854 painting by William Holman Hunt

== Literature ==
- Nūr al-ʿĀlam ("The Light of the World"), a 1330–50 treatise by Joseph ibn Naḥmias
- Light of the World: The Pope, The Church and the Signs of the Times, a 2010 book by Pope Benedict XVI
- Light of the World, a 2013 novel by James Lee Burke
- "The Light of the World", a short story by Ernest Hemingway in the 1933 short story collection Winner Take Nothing

== Music ==
- Light of the World (band), a British jazz-funk band
- The Light of the World (Sullivan), an 1873 oratorio by Arthur Sullivan
- Light of the World (album), a 2008 album by Kamasi Washington
- "Light of the World" (song), a 1993 song by Kim Appleby
- "Light of the World (Sing Hallelujah)", a 2020 song by We the Kingdom

== Films ==
- The Light of the World (film), a 2003 American film
- Light of the World (film), a 2025 American film

== Other uses ==
- La Luz del Mundo ("The Light of the World"), a Mexican Christian denomination

== See also ==
- The Light of Asia, an 1879 book by Edwin Arnold
  - The Light of Asia (oratorio), an 1886 oratorio by Dudley Buck
  - Prem Sanyas (The Light of Asia), a 1925 Indo-German film
