= Nanoscale (disambiguation) =

Nanoscale is the length scale applicable to nanotechnology, usually cited as 1–100 nanometers.

Nanoscale or NanoScale may also refer to:

- NanoScale Corporation, an American nanotechnology company
- Nanoscale (journal), published by the Royal Society of Chemistry
- Nanoscale Research Letters, a journal published by Springer
