= WORMS Award =

Award for women in operations research

The WORMS Award for the Advancement of Women in Operations Research and Management Science is given annually by WORMS, the Forum on Women in OR/MS of the Institute for Operations Research and the Management Sciences, to "a person who has contributed significantly to the advancement and recognition of women in the field of Operations Research and the Management Sciences (OR/MS)".

== Recipients ==
The winners of the WORMS Award have included:

Name	Institution	Year
Cynthia Barnhart	MIT	2005
Jane Ammons	Georgia Tech	2005
Radhika Kulkarni	SAS Institute	2006
Anna Nagurney	U. Mass. Amherst	2007
Candace A. Yano	UC Berkeley	2008
Alice E. Smith	Auburn	2009
Brenda L. Dietrich	IBM	2010
Berna Dengiz	Başkent Univ.	2011
Vicki Sauter	U. Missouri–St. Louis	2012
Kathryn Stecke	UT Dallas	2013
Aleda Roth	Clemson	2014
Margaret Brandeau	Stanford	2015
Karen Smilowitz	Northwestern	2016
Ruth J. Williams	UC San Diego	2017
Susan M. Sanchez	Naval Postgraduate School	2018
Laura Albert	U. Wisconsin	2019
Sharon Arroyo	Boeing	2019
Julie Ivy	NC State	2020
Pınar Keskinocak	Georgia Tech	2021
Georgia Perakis	MIT/Sloan School of Management	2022
Ruchi Mahindru	IBM	2022
