= Karen Smilowitz =

American transportation scientist

Karen Renee Smilowitz is an American transportation scientist and operations researcher whose research concerns humanitarian logistics, including vehicle routing for disaster relief efforts, as well as safety and emergency preparedness for large public events such as marathons. She is James N. and Margie M. Krebs Professor in Industrial Engineering and Management Sciences at Northwestern University and formerly served as editor-in-chief of the journal Transportation Science.

== Education and career ==
Smilowitz majored in civil engineering and operations research at Princeton University, graduating in 1995. She went to the University of California, Berkeley for graduate study in civil and environmental engineering, specializing in transportation, earning a master's degree in 1998 and completing her Ph.D. in 2001. Her dissertation, Design and operation of multimode, multi-service logistics systems, was supervised by Carlos F. Daganzo.

She has been a faculty member in industrial engineering and management sciences at Northwestern University since 2001. She became a full professor in 2015, was named Charles Deering McCormick Professor of Teaching Excellence in 2015 and Krebs Professor in 2018, and added an affiliation with the Kellogg School of Management in 2019.

As well as serving as editor-in-chief of Transportation Science, she has been president of the INFORMS Transportation Science & Logistics Society, for a three-year term from 2015 to 2018.

== Recognition ==
Smilowitz was the 2016 winner of the WORMS Award for the Advancement of Women in OR/MS of the Institute for Operations Research and the Management Sciences (INFORMS). In 2022 she was named a Fellow of INFORMS, "for outstanding research in transportation, logistics and nonprofit operations, significant contributions to the practice of OR for social good and advancing equity and diversity".
