= Thomas Caywood =

Thomas E. Caywood
- Born: May 9, 1919; Lake Park, Iowa, U.S.
- Died: December 19, 2008 (aged 89); Peoria, Arizona, U.S.
- Education: Cornell College (B.A.); Northwestern University (M.A.); Harvard University (Ph.D.)
- Spouse: Mary Miller (m. 1941)
- Awards: George E. Kimball Medal
- Scientific career
- Fields: Mathematics, computer science
- Workplaces: Harvard University

Academic background
- Thesis: Axially Symmetric Harmonic Functions
- Doctoral advisor: Garrett Birkhoff

Thomas E. Caywood (May 9, 1919 – December 19, 2008) was an American computer scientist and cofounder of the Operations Research Society of America.

== Early life ==
Thomas E. Caywood was born on May 9, 1919, in Lake Park, Iowa, to Alice (née Ballenbach) and Harry E. Caywood, dentist, mayor and township clerk of Lake Park. He graduated from Lake Park High School in 1935. Caywood received a Bachelor of Arts in mathematics and physics from Cornell College in 1939. He then received a Master of Arts in mathematics from Northwestern University in 1940. He went on to join the Harvard Systems Research Laboratory. Having gained a PhD from Harvard University in 1947. His thesis was titled Axially Symmetric Harmonic Functions and he was advised by Garrett Birkhoff.

== Career ==
Caywood moved to the Institute for Air Weapons Research at the University of Chicago. He then joined the Armour Research Foundation of the IIT Research Institute as a supervisor of operations research. In 1953, he co-founded Caywood-Shiller Associates, an independent consulting firm for the industry and military, and served as a managing partner for 25 years. After he retired, he taught operations research as a lecturer at the University of Chicago Booth School of Business and California State University, East Bay.

In 1965 his name appeared on a list of academics involved with Project Camelot.

He became president of Cornell College board of trustees in 1970 and served as the president of the National Research Society. He was elected to the 2002 class of Fellows of the Institute for Operations Research and the Management Sciences.

== Personal life ==
Caywood married Mary Miller of Buffalo Center, Iowa, in 1941. She also attended Cornell College.

== Death ==
Caywood died on December 19, 2008, in Peoria, Arizona.

== Awards ==
Caywood received the George E. Kimball Medal in 1974. He also received the J. Steinhardt Prize.
