= Margaret Brandeau =

American management scientist and engineer

- Title: Coleman F. Fung Professor in the Stanford University School of Engineering
- Awards: Institute for Operations Research and the Management Sciences (INFORMS) President's Award; INFORMS WORMS Award for the Advancement of Women in OR/MS; Philip McCord Morse Lectureship Award.
- Honours: Fellow of the Institute for Operations Research and the Management Sciences

Margaret Louise Brandeau is an American management scientist and engineer whose research applies operations research to decision-making in public health, and has made contributions to optimize health care systems. The main focus of her work is on the development of applied mathematical and economic models to support health policy decisions. She is the Coleman F. Fung Professor in the Stanford University School of Engineering, and also holds a courtesy affiliation with the Stanford University School of Medicine.

With Edward H. Kaplan, Brandeau is the editor of the book Modeling the AIDS Epidemic: Planning, Policy, and Prediction (Raven Press, 1994). She has also studied strategies for responding to the opioid epidemic in the United States, and the question of whether eating organic food has health benefits.

== Education ==
Brandeau earned a bachelor's degree in mathematics in 1977 from the Massachusetts Institute of Technology (MIT). After continuing at MIT for a master's degree in operations research in 1978, she completed her Ph.D. in engineering economic systems in 1985 at Stanford University.

== Early life ==
Brandeau was born in New York City. She then started moving around when she was young, until she went to college. She is one of six, being child number two. Her mother was a real estate agent, broker, and appraiser. Her father enlisted in World War II but since his IQ level they sent him to MIT to become an engineer because at that time they needed engineers. He later got his masters and bachelors at MIT as an electrical engineer covered by the U.S Navy. After the war he went to Harvard Law School, and Harvard Business School. Before Margaret Brandaeu became a scientist, she wanted to become a novelist. There were two things that she liked, math and reading/writing. When she went to college she was leaning towards something more humanistic rather than mathematics. The reason she chose MITwas because her parents said: You can write anytime you want, but it is a little harder to teach yourself Math.

== Career ==
Margaret Brandeau is a renowned figure in the area of operations research and public health. She is a professor at Stanford University, while teaching she has led collaborative research at the intersection of mathematical modeling and public health policies. Professor Brandeau’s contributions span across a wide range of vital health concerns, such as HIV, AIDS, tuberculosis, malaria, and pandemic preparedness. Her mathematical models have helped her find cost-effective strategies. Margaret Brandeau’s work goes beyond theoretical frameworks, constantly informing real- world decision making.

== Recognition ==
In 2008, Brandeau was the winner of the Institute for Operations Research and the Management Sciences (INFORMS) President's Award "for her pioneering research on public health policy models, including those for HIV and drug abuse prevention and treatment, and for translating her results into improved U.S. and international health policies". She became a Fellow of INFORMS in 2009. In 2015 she won the INFORMS WORMS Award for the Advancement of Women in OR/MS, and the Philip McCord Morse Lectureship Award.

She was named an honorary professor of the National University of Engineering in Peru in 2016.

She was given the Pierskalla Best Paper Award in 2001 and 2017. She was also a finalist for the same award in 2014

== Publications ==
Margaret Brandeau has come up with many ideas to help books and articles in the science and medical realm. As of 2022, she has not published any books as well known as her other works. However, she has contributed to chapters and to many other research papers and articles in honored academic journals. Her most famous work is her help in Operation Research and Health Care: A Handbook of Methods and Applications in 2004. Other publications of hers resemble similar objectives such as mathematical models, medical diseases, United States policies, HIV & AIDS, and epidemiology. She has written many articles that include all of those areas. Two of them being, Modeling the AIDS Epidemic: Planning, Policy, and Prediction, and Responding to the US Opioid Crisis: Leveraging Analytics to Support Decision Making.
