= Dengiz =

Dengiz is a Turkish surname. Notable people with this name include:

- Berna Dengiz, Turkish industrial engineer
- Orhan Dengiz (1929–1983), Turkish politician
- Özgür Dengiz (born 1984), Turkish murderer
- Rachel Dengiz, American filmmaker and musician, member of Bush Tetras spinoff band Command V

== See also ==
- Dengiz Beg Rumlu (died 1613), Turkoman courtier and envoy to Spain
