= Brenda L. Dietrich =

American operations researcher

Brenda Lynn Jorgensen Dietrich is an American operations researcher, the Arthur and Helen Geoffrion Professor of Practice in the School of Operations Research at Cornell University. She has been Vice President of Business Analytics and Mathematical Sciences at IBM, and a president of INFORMS.

== Education and career ==
After earning a bachelor's degree in mathematics in 1980 from the University of North Carolina, with highest honors and Phi Beta Kappa, Dietrich went to Cornell University intending to get a graduate degree in mathematics. However, after working as an intern at the United States Department of Energy, she switched to operations research. She completed her Ph.D. in 1986; her dissertation, A Unifying Interpretation of Several Combinatorial Dualities, was supervised by Robert G. Bland.

Dietrich began working at IBM's Thomas J. Watson Research Center while still a graduate student. She was president of INFORMS in 2006, was appointed IBM Fellow in 2007 and became a vice president at IBM in 2008. In 2017, she moved to Cornell as the Geoffrion Professor.

== Books ==
Dietrich is the co-author, with Emily C. Plachy and Maureen F. Norton, of the book Analytics Across the Enterprise: How IBM Realizes Business Value from Big Data and Analytics (IBM Press, 2014). She is the co-editor, with Rakesh V. Vohra, of Mathematics of the Internet: E-Auction and Markets (IMA Volumes in Mathematics and its Applications, Springer, 2002).

== Recognition ==
Dietrich was named an IBM Fellow in 2007. She is also a Fellow of INFORMS, elected in 2010, and was the 2010 winner of the INFORMS WORMS Award for the Advancement of Women in Operations Research and Management Science, and the 2021 winner of the INFORMS President's Award.

In 2014 she was elected to the National Academy of Engineering "for contributions to engineering algorithms, frameworks, and tools to solve complex business problems".
