= Janny Leung =

Chinese operations researcher and academic administrator

Janny May-yee Leung (Chinese: 梁美兒) is a Chinese operations researcher and academic administrator, the master of Choi Kai Yau College at the University of Macau and courtesy professor in the State Key Laboratory of Internet of Things for Smart City of the University of Macau. Topics in her research have included transportation scheduling, logistics, facility location, and polyhedral combinatorics.

== Education and career ==
Leung studied applied mathematics in Radcliffe College at Harvard University, graduating in 1979. After studying for a second bachelor's degree at Magdalen College, Oxford, from 1979 to 1981, she earned a Ph.D. in operations research at the Massachusetts Institute of Technology in 1986, under the supervision of Thomas L. Magnanti. Her dissertation was Polyhedral Structure of Capacitated Fixed Charge Problems and A Problem in Delivery Route Planning.

She became an assistant professor of operations research in the Yale University School of Organization and Management, and in 1991 moved to the Management Information Systems Department at the University of Arizona, earning tenure there.

In 1996 she moved to the City University of Hong Kong as an associate professor of management sciences, and in 1998 she moved to the Chinese University of Hong Kong, in systems engineering and engineering management. At the Chinese University of Hong Kong, she helped found Morningside College, becoming its first dean of students and deputy master in 2009, and later becoming its warden.

Leung became professor of science and engineering, and founding master of Shaw College of the Chinese University of Hong Kong, Shenzhen (CUHK-Shenzhen), in 2016. Morningside College continues to list her as an emerita fellow.

Since 2019, she has resigned from CUHK-Shenzhen and become master of Choi Kai Yau College at the University of Macau.

== Recognition ==
Leung was president of the Forum for Women in OR/MS of the Institute for Operations Research and the Management Sciences (INFORMS) for 2001–2002. She was named a Fellow of INFORMS in 2020, "for her extensive contributions to educational planning and leadership, multidimensional service to INFORMS, and theoretical and applied research contributions to integer programming, transportation and logistics". She is also a founding fellow of the Logistics and Transportation Division of The Hong Kong Institution of Engineers, a fellow of the Chartered Institute of Logistics and Transport, and a life member of Clare Hall, Cambridge.
