= Natel Energy =

Natel Energy, Inc.
- Company type: Private
- Industry: Hydropower, Renewable energy
- Founded: 2009; 17 years ago
- Headquarters: United States
- Key people: Gia Schneider, Abe Schneider
- Website: http://www.natelenergy.com

Natel Energy is an Alameda, California-based designer of hydroelectric turbines (RHTs) that enable high survival rates for fish passing downstream through the turbines. Since its founding in 2009 by Gia and Abe Schneider, Natel has received funding from the United States Department of Energy and Small Business Innovation Research Program to support commercialization of its technologies.

Natel completed its first commercial installation in partnership with the Buckeye Water Conservation and Drainage District in Buckeye, Arizona, in early 2010. Natel now has three installations of its latest turbine design (the "Restoration Hydro Turbine"), in Maine, Oregon, and Austria.
