= Magnanti =

Magnanti is a surname. Notable people with the surname include:

- Brooke Magnanti, British scientist, blogged as Belle de Jour
- Thomas L. Magnanti, American engineer and academic
