= Bill Tan =

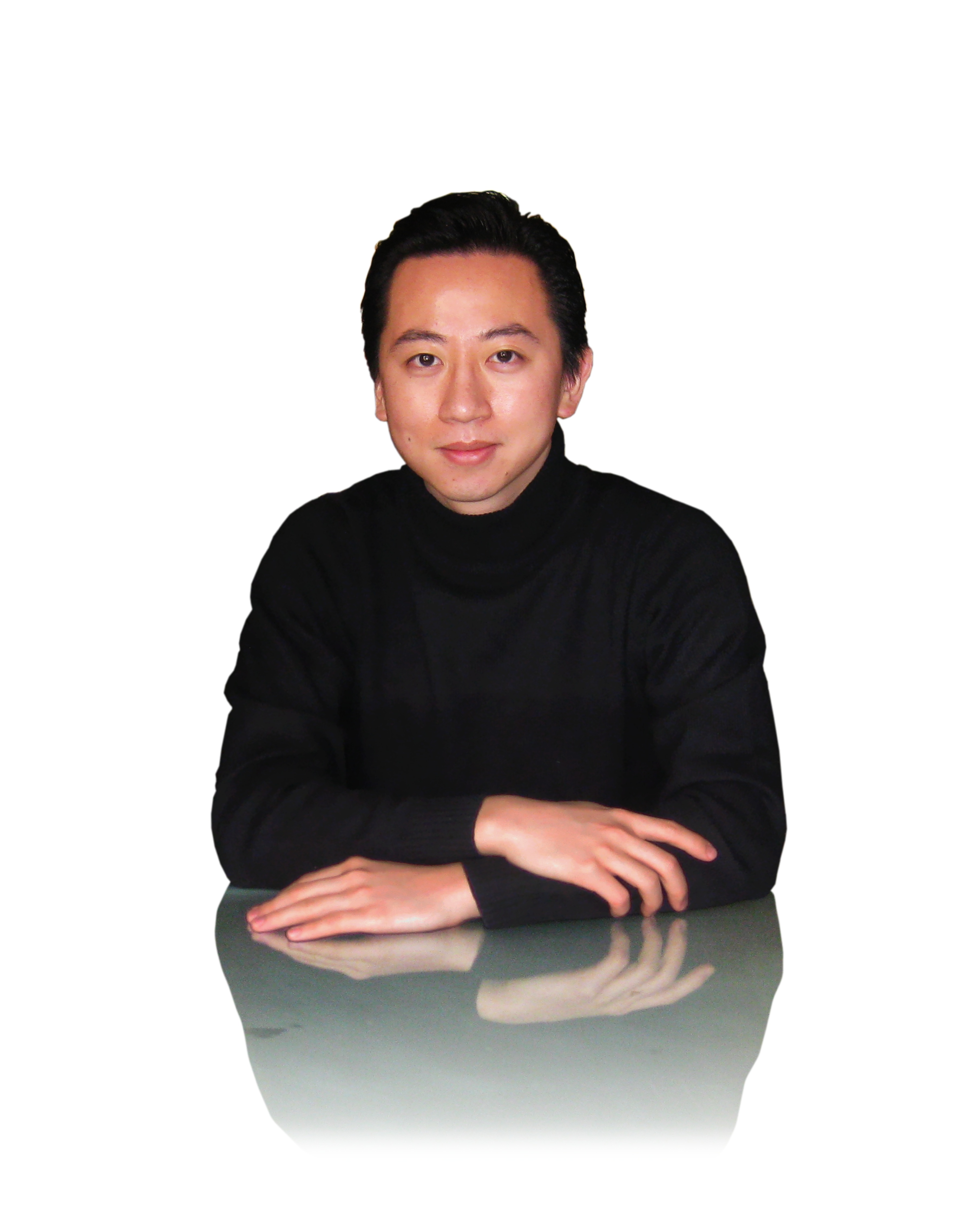
Bill Tan

William Z. Tan (Bill Tan) is an American business person in the healthcare sector.

== Career ==
He received a BA from New York University and a M.Ed from Harvard University. Tan came to the United States from China when he was 15 years old and often acted as family interpreter.

In 2002 Bill Tan founded Transcendent Endeavors, an umbrella company based out of New York City that uses National Institutes of Health grants to develop digital communication tools. These tools, especially Canopy Innovations, aim to assist communication between patients—particularly those for whom English is not their first language—and healthcare professionals. As of 2018 Transcendent Endeavors had received Small Business Innovation Research (SBIR) funding totalling over US$29 million, and Tan was named as Principal Investigator on 55 of the 56 projects supported.

Tan holds an appointment as an Adjunct Assistant Professor of Medicine at New York University School of Medicine. He was named by Mayor Michael Bloomberg as a New York City Venture Fellow in 2012.
