= Filipowski =

Filipowski is a surname. Notable people with this surname include:

- Andrew Filipowski (born 1950), American businessman
- Grzegorz Filipowski (born 1966), Polish figure skater
- Herschell Filipowski (1816–1872), Lithuanian-born British Jewish Hebraist, editor, mathematician, linguist and actuary
- Kyle Filipowski (born 2003), American basketball player
- Sharon Filipowski (born 1966), American applied mathematician and operations researcher
