= Decisive Analytics Corporation =

- Industry: Defense analytics
- Founded: 1996
- Defunct: 2020
- Fate: Acquired by Whitney, Bradley and Brown, Inc.
- Headquarters: Arlington County, United States
- Key people: John Donnellon
- Number of employees: 86
- Parent: Whitney, Bradley and Brown, Inc.
- Website: www.dac.us

Decisive Analytics Corporation (DAC) is an American defense analytics provider which was bought by Whitney, Bradley and Brown, Inc. (WBB) in 2020. The company was founded in 1996. DAC headquarters is located in Arlington, Virginia. Clients include United States Intelligence Community, Missile Defense Agency, United States Department of Defense and commercial customers.

== Products and services ==
Decisive Analytics Corporation provides analytical products and services to the Department of Defense and the United States intelligence community. This includes systems engineering, life-cycle logistics, cybersecurity, data analytics, and machine learning.

== Published works, conference papers, and patents ==
- C W Misner, J van Meter, D Fiske. Numerical relativity beyond I^{+}. Gravitation and astrophysics: On the occasion of the 90th year of general relativity: Proceedings of the VII Asia-Pacific International Conference: National Central University, Taiwan, 23–26 November 2005.
- Fiske, David R. (21 October 2006). "Error and symmetry analysis of Misner's algorithm for spherical harmonic decomposition on a cubic grid". Classical and Quantum Gravity. 23 (20): 5951–5960. arXiv:gr-qc/0412047. Bibcode:2006CQGra..23.5951F. doi:10.1088/0264-9381/23/20/016. S2CID 6316383.
- Misner, Charles W. (1 January 2006). "Excising das All: Evolving Maxwell waves beyond scri". Phys. Rev. D. 74 (6) 064003. arXiv:gr-qc/0603034. Bibcode:2006PhRvD..74f4003M. doi:10.1103/PhysRevD.74.064003. S2CID 5307362.
- "Abstract Submitted for the APR07 Meeting" (PDF). Archived from the original (PDF) on 2011-10-02.
- "Approved Workimg Groups Abstract" (PDF). Archived from the original (PDF) on 2011-09-29.
- D Fanjoy, D Pederson. Solving variations of the assignment problem with a genetic algorithm. Military Operations Research Society Symposium. June 2007.
- Kittner, Cristiana C. Brafman (4 July 2007). "The Role of Safe Havens in Islamist Terrorism". Terrorism and Political Violence. 19 (3): 307–329. doi:10.1080/09546550701246791. S2CID 145505382.
- "Special and Other Sessions" (PDF). Archived from the original (PDF) on 2011-09-29.
- David, Andrew; Fiske, David (20 February 2017). "A Framework for Integrated Tracking and Discrimination". Archived from the original on 12 March 2012 – via Defense Technical Information Center.
- Pederson, Debbie (12 June 2008). "Ensuring Schedulability in the Weapon Target Assignment Problem". Archived from the original on 12 March 2012 – via Defense Technical Information Center.
- Thompson, J.; Bradley, J. (1 July 2007). "Predictive analysis network tool for human knowledge elicitation and reasoning". 2007 10th International Conference on Information Fusion. pp. 1–6. doi:10.1109/ICIF.2007.4408129. ISBN 978-0-662-45804-3. S2CID 14484620 – via IEEE Xplore.
- Hoffman, Karla; Menon, Dinesh (1 March 2010). "A Practical Combinatorial Clock Exchange for Spectrum Licenses". Decision Analysis. 7 (1): 58–77. doi:10.1287/deca.1090.0169.
- Durbin, Martin; Hoffman, Karla (1 February 2008). "OR Practice—The Dance of the Thirty-Ton Trucks: Dispatching and Scheduling in a Dynamic Environment". Operations Research. 56 (1): 3–19. doi:10.1287/opre.1070.0459.
- "Method and Apparatus for Streamlined Wireless Data Transfer – Patent application".
- "Design Maturity Model - June 99". Archived from the original on 2010-01-24.

== Awards ==
- Washingtonian Magazine Great Places to Work (2013, 2011, 2009, 2007)
- Washington Business Journal Best Places to Work (2013, 2011, 2009)
- National Tibbetts Award SBIR Program Success (2007)
- Greater Washington Government Contractor Awards: Small Contractor of the Year Nominee (2005)
- Arlington County Chamber of Commerce Tech-e Corporate Citizen of the Year (2005)
- Virginia Chamber of Commerce Fantastic 50 (2006)
- Inc. (magazine) 5000 List (2009 and 2005)
- Deloitte Technology Fast 50: Virginia (2007, 2006, 2005, and 2004)
- Deloitte Fast 500 (2006, 2005, and 2004)
- CRN Magazine VAR 500 List (2010, 2009 and 2008)
