= MBF =

MBF may refer to:

- MBF, an Australian health insurance provider now merged with Bupa
- Marine's Best Friend, a Doom source port based on Boom
- One thousand board feet, a measurement in common use in the North American lumber industry
- Microsoft Binary Format, a floating point number format
- MBF Bioscience, a bioscience research software development company
- Minimum breaking force, a measurement for rope strengths in kilonewtons (kN)
- Master of Banking and Finance
- Militärbefehlshaber in Frankreich (English: German Military Command in France), which administered Occupied France during World War II
- Man's Best Friend (Sabrina Carpenter album), a 2025 album by Sabrina Carpenter
