= Susan M. Sanchez =

American mathematician

Academic background
- Education: University of Michigan; Cornell University

Academic work
- Discipline: applied statistics
- Institutions: Naval Postgraduate School
- Main interests: operations research

Susan Marie Malila Sanchez (born 1959) is an American applied statistician and an expert in military applications of operations research, agent-based simulation, and in data farming of simulation results. She is a professor of operations research at the Naval Postgraduate School.

== Education ==
Sanchez is a graduate of Huron High School (Ann Arbor, Michigan), and earned a bachelor's degree in industrial and operations engineering from the University of Michigan in 1981. She completed a Ph.D. in operations research at Cornell University in 1986, with a dissertation on Contributions to the Bernoulli Selection Problem supervised by Robert E. Bechhofer.

== Career ==
She held a position as a faculty member in the College of Business and Public Administration at the University of Arizona from 1985 to 1992, and in the School of Business Administration of the University of Missouri–St. Louis from 1993 to 2001. However, after visiting the Naval Postgraduate School from 1999 to 2000 on sabbatical, she decided to move there as a professor. At the Naval Postgraduate School, she is a professor in the Operations Research Department, and is also affiliated with the Graduate School of Business & Public Policy. Since 2006, she has directed the Simulation Experiments & Efficient Design (SEED) Center for Data Farming at the Naval Postgraduate School.

== Service ==
Sanchez chaired an Ad Hoc Committee on Women in Operations Research from 1993 to 1995 that led to the foundation of the Institute for Operations Research and the Management Sciences (INFORMS) Forum on Women in OR/MS. She was president of the Forum on Women in OR/MS in 2003, and president of the INFORMS College on Simulation from 2002 to 2004. She chaired the American Statistical Association Section on Statistics in Defense and Homeland Security in 2013.

== Recognition ==
The INFORMS Military Applications Society gave Sanchez their Bernard Koopman Prize for outstanding work in military operations research in 2013. At the 2016 Winter Simulation Conference she was recognized as the 2016 "Titan of Simulation". She was elected to the 2017 class of Fellows of INFORMS, and was the 2018 winner of the INFORMS WORMS Award for the Advancement of Women in OR/MS.
