= Smilowitz =

Smilowitz is the German name for the town of Smilovice (Frýdek-Místek District), in the Czech Republic. It is also a surname. Notable people with the surname include:

- Erika J. Waters, also published as Erika Smilowitz, American editor, academic and critic
- Karen Smilowitz, American transportation scientist
- Laura Smilowitz, American physicist
