= NanoScale Corporation =

- Type: Privately held company
- Industry: Nanotechnology
- Founded: 1995
- Founder: Kenneth Klabunde, Ph.D.
- Headquarters: 1310 Research Park Dr. Manhattan, KS, United States
- Area served: International
- Products: List of products
- Website: Official website at the Wayback Machine (archived 2007-03-20)

NanoScale Corporation (formerly Nantek, Inc., and NanoScale Materials, Inc.) was a private US corporation, founded in 1995 in Manhattan, Kansas by Dr. Kenneth J. Klabunde as Nantek, Inc. Klabunde's goal was to further develop and commercialize certain intellectual properties of Kansas State University.

In January 2001, the company's name was changed to NanoScale Materials, Inc. They were reincorporated in July 2007, as a Delaware corporation, with the current name NanoScale Corporation. They closed down following wire-fraud.

NanoScale developed, manufactured, and sold nano-crystalline metal oxides and other materials for a wide array of applications, including odor neutralization, hazardous chemical neutralization, and environmental remediation. Scientists affiliated with NanoScale Corporation have collaborated to write, and publish, scientific papers and publications in the subjects of material science and chemistry nanotechnology.

== History ==
It was founded by Dr. Kenneth J. Klabunde founded Nantek, Inc., in 1995 to further develop and commercialize certain intellectual properties of Kansas State University. The private US corporation was located in Manhattan, Kansas.

In January 2001, the company's name was changed to NanoScale Materials, Inc. They were reincorporated in July 2007, as a Delaware corporation, with the current name NanoScale Corporation. They closed down following wire-fraud.

== Services ==
NanoScale worked with a variety of private, commercial, and government customers. NanoScale developed, manufactured, and sold nano-crystalline metal oxides and other materials for a wide array of applications, including odor neutralization, hazardous chemical neutralization, and environmental remediation. Scientists affiliated with NanoScale Corporation have collaborated to write, and publish, many scientific papers and publications in the subjects of material science and advanced chemistry nanotechnology.

NanoScale's government contract history is extensive, totaling over 18.6 million dollars between 2000 and 2008, specializing in engineering, physical sciences, and biological science. The company has a history of multiple Small Business Innovation Research (SBIR) awarded projects with the US Army, in a wide range of applications. One such project focused on decontamination wipes for war fighters to use when coming in contact with chemical warfare agents, and acid-gas remediation research to treat hydrogen sulfide (H_{2}S), carbonyl sulfide (COS), and other chemical compounds. Another project sponsored by the US EPA, SBIR division, focused on nano-crystalline materials for the hot fuel-gas clean-up applications, such as zinc oxide-based sorbents for moderate-temperature, high-capacity hydrogen sulfide and carbonyl sulfide clean-up, supported copper oxide sorbents for high-temperature H_{2}S, COS, and possibly mercury clean-up, and nickel-based supported catalysts for high temperature ammonia (NH_{3}) and hydrogen cyanide (HCN) decomposition. The US Army SBIR Newsletter stated, "In addition to all of the first response applications for FAST-ACT, the technology is being further developed for decontamination wipes, residue-free wipes, and is currently utilized in commercial odor elimination products such as OdorKlenz and Nano-Zorb." NanoScale Corporation researched, developed, and produced products for environmental remediation, often at the actual nano scale.

=== List of products and services ===
NanoScale's products are metal oxide powders, granules, and suspensions.

==== Products ====
- ChemKlenz
- FAST-ACT
- NanoActive materials
- NanoZorb
- OdorKlenz
- OdorKlenz-Air
- OdorKlenz Laundry
- SpillKlenz

==== Services ====
- Analytical chemistry services
- Engineered solutions
- Contract research and development

== Recognition ==
NanoScale's was recognized by the Kansas Technology Enterprise Corporation, as a SBIR Bridge Award Winner, the National Science Foundation, Popular Mechanics as a Breakthrough Award Winner, was a winner of the Tibbetts Award, by Kansas BioScience Organization, was a winner of the Kansas Department of Commerce Merit Award, and was a finalist for the Kansas Governor's Exporter of the Year.
