= Judith Liebman =

American engineer and academic (1936–2023)

Judith S. Liebman (July 2, 1936 – July 8, 2023) was an American operations researcher, civil engineer, and mechanical engineer. She was a professor emerita at the University of Illinois at Urbana–Champaign and the only female president of the Operations Research Society of America (now INFORMS).

== Education and career ==
Liebman was interested in science as a child, and was inspired by a biography of Marie Curie. She earned a bachelor's degree in physics from the University of Colorado Boulder in 1958. She then worked as an engineer and programmer at Convair Astronautics, General Electric, and the chemistry department of Cornell University, where her husband was pursuing a degree in environmental engineering.

At Cornell, she began taking courses in operations research, and when her husband moved to Johns Hopkins University as a new faculty member, she moved with him and began graduate study there. She completed a Ph.D. in operations research at Johns Hopkins in 1971. She stayed at Johns Hopkins as an assistant professor of public health administration, and operations research, but in 1972 she moved to the University of Illinois at Urbana–Champaign with a major appointment in the Department of Civil Engineering and a minor appointment in Mechanical and Industrial Engineering. Because both Liebman and her husband were joining the University of Illinois faculty at the same time and in the same department, her appointment required special approval from the president of the university to override the rules then in place against hiring the wife of a male faculty member.

At the time, there was only one other female faculty member in the College of Engineering at Illinois (in the Department of Physics), so she became the first female engineering faculty member. In 1978, when her husband became Head of Civil Engineering, she shifted her appointment entirely to the Department of Mechanical and Industrial Engineering. She became a full professor in 1984. She served as Vice-Chancellor for Research and Dean of the Graduate College of the University of Illinois at Urbana-Champaign from 1987 to 1992. Liebman and her husband both retired in 1996, although they continued part-time teaching for several years.

== Service ==
Liebman served as President of her professional society, the Operations Research Society of America, in 1987. She was the first woman president of the society, before it merged with The Institute of Management Sciences to form the Institute for Operations Research and the Management Sciences (INFORMS) in 1995.

== Death ==
Liebman died on July 8, 2023, at the age of 86.

== Awards and honors ==
- In 1996, INFORMS awarded Liebman the George E. Kimball Medal, for outstanding contributions to the profession of operations research.
- In 2002, Liebman became one of the inaugural Fellows of INFORMS.
