= Alexandra Newman =

American operations researcher and industrial engineer

Alexandra Mary Newman is an American operations researcher and industrial engineer whose research concerns the application of operations research to mining, mine planning, and logistics. She is a professor of mechanical engineering and director of the Operations Research with Engineering Program at the Colorado School of Mines, and editor-in-chief of the INFORMS Journal on Applied Analytics.

== Education and career ==
Newman is the daughter of two classics scholars at the University of Illinois Urbana-Champaign, J. Kevin Newman and Frances Stickney Newman. She has a bachelor's degree in applied mathematics from the University of Chicago. As a cross country running athlete at the University of Chicago, she was a 1993 recipient of the Gertrude Dudley Medal as an outstanding senior athlete. She graduated in 1993.

At the encouragement of R. Kipp Martin, she studied industrial engineering and operations research at the University of California, Berkeley, where she received a master's degree in 1994 and completed her Ph.D. in 1998. Her 1998 doctoral dissertation, Optimizing Intermodal Rail Operations, was supervised by Candace Arai Yano; she also cites Ilan Adler as a mentor for her teaching at Berkeley.

She became a research assistant professor of operations research at the Naval Postgraduate School. She intended to continue as a research professor, but Yano instead persuaded her to take a tenure-track position at the Colorado School of Mines, where she continues to work as a full professor.

== Recognition ==
Newman was a Fulbright Fellow in 2010, funding a visit to the University of Chile.

She was the 2013 recipient of the Institute for Operations Research and the Management Sciences (INFORMS) Prize for the Teaching of the OR/MS Practice. She was named as a Fellow of INFORMS in the 2024 class of fellows.

The Colorado School of Mines gave Newman its W. M. Keck Mentorship Award for mentoring graduate students in 2023.

== Personal life ==
Newman continues to run cross country as part of the Impala Racing team, and took second place in her age division at the 2025 USATF Cross Country Championships in January 2025 in Lubbock, Texas.
