= Karla Hoffman =

American operations researcher

- Education: Rutgers University; George Washington University.
- Awards: Department of Commerce Silver Medal; Applied Research Award of the National Institute of Standards and Technology; George E. Kimball Medal; Harvey J. Greenberg Impact Award
- Honours: Fellow of the Institute for Operations Research and the Management Sciences

Karla Leigh Hoffman is an American operations researcher, and the former president of the Institute for Operations Research and the Management Sciences. She is a professor of systems engineering and operations research in the Volgenau School of Engineering of George Mason University. Her research has focused on practical applications of operations research and optimization to problems including transportation scheduling, airport landing slot allocation, spectrum auctions, and telecommunications budgeting.

== Education and career ==
Hoffman graduated from Rutgers University in 1969 with a bachelor's degree in mathematics. She then studied operations research at George Washington University, earning an MBA in 1971 and completing her doctorate (D.Sc.) in 1975. Her dissertation, A Successive Underestimation Function for Concave Minimization, was directed by James E. Falk.

She became a postdoctoral researcher at the National Institute of Standards and Technology (NIST) in 1975 and remained at NIST as a mathematics researcher in the Operations Research Division until 1984, when she moved to George Mason University. She was promoted to full professor in 1989, and served as acting chair and chair of her department from 1996 to 2001, seeing it through a change of name from operations research and operations engineering to systems engineering and operations research.

She served as president of the Institute for Operations Research and the Management Sciences (INFORMS) for the 1998 term.

== Research ==
Hoffman's research has emphasized applications of combinatorial optimization to transportation, telecommunications and auction design. One of her most prominent projects was her participation in the team that designed and implemented the Federal Communications Commission's (FCC) 2016–2017 spectrum incentive auction, which transferred radio-frequency spectrum from television broadcasting to wireless communications. The auction combined payments to broadcasters willing to relinquish spectrum with the sale of newly available frequencies to wireless providers. Its implementation required solving large-scale optimization problems to determine how television stations remaining on the air could be reassigned to fewer channels without causing unacceptable interference.

The multidisciplinary team, which included Hoffman, developed and applied optimization models, decomposition techniques, heuristics and Boolean satisfiability solvers to address these problems. The resulting auction repurposed 84 MHz of television spectrum and generated nearly $20 billion in gross revenue, including more than $10 billion paid to broadcasters and approximately $7.3 billion directed toward reducing the federal deficit. These results reflected the work of the overall project team, of which Hoffman was a key member.

== Recognition ==
In 1984, Hoffman won both the Department of Commerce Silver Medal and the inaugural Applied Research Award of the National Institute of Standards and Technology.

The Institute for Operations Research and the Management Sciences elected her as a Fellow in 2003, and gave her their George E. Kimball Medal for distinguished service to the institute and the profession in 2005. In 2009 she became the first recipient of the Harvey J. Greenberg Impact Award for Service to the INFORMS Computing Society.

In 2018, a team of researchers organized by Hoffman and working for the Federal Communications Commission on spectrum allocation won the INFORMS Franz Edelman Award for Achievement in Advanced Analytics, Operations Research, and Management Science.
