= Thomas L. Magnanti =

American engineer and university president (born 1945)

- Born: 1945 (age 80–81); Syracuse, New York
- Education: Stanford University (M.S., PhD); Syracuse University (BS)
- Known for: Dean of MIT School of Engineering
- Awards: Frederick W. Lanchester Prize (1993); George E. Kimball Medal
- Scientific career
- Fields: Operations Research, Management
- Workplaces: Singapore University of Technology and Design (SUTD)
- Thesis: Independence Systems and Combinatorial Optimization (1972)
- Doctoral advisor: George Dantzig
- Doctoral students: Janny Leung; Georgia Perakis

Thomas Lee Magnanti (born 1945) is an American engineer and Institute Professor and former Dean of the School of Engineering at the Massachusetts Institute of Technology.

Magnanti served as the founding president of the Singapore University of Technology and Design from 2009 to 2017.

== Biography ==
Magnanti received an undergraduate degree in chemical engineering from Syracuse University College of Engineering and Computer Science (1967) and master's degrees in both Statistics (1969) and Mathematics (1971) from Stanford University, where he also received his doctorate in Operations Research (1972). His dissertation, Independence Systems and Combinatorial Optimization, was supervised by George Dantzig.

Magnanti is an Institute Professor of the Massachusetts Institute of Technology, highest title awarded to a faculty member. He is the former Dean of the MIT School of Engineering. He has served on thesis committees for approximately 70 doctoral students, supervising over 25; his students have included Anantaram Balakrishnan, Bruce L. Golden, Janny Leung, and Georgia Perakis. He became the first president of Singapore's fourth university, Singapore University of Technology and Design in 2009, until his retirement in 2017.

Magnanti has been editor-in-chief of the journal Operations Research.

Magnanti is a member of the National Academy of Engineering and the American Academy of Arts and Sciences. He was a founding co-director of MIT's Leaders for Manufacturing Program (now the Leaders for Global Operations program) and the System Design and Management program. He is a past president of the Operations Research Society of America (ORSA) and of the Institute for Operations Research and the Management Sciences (INFORMS).

He has received honorary doctorates from Linköping University, the Université de Montréal, and the University of Louvain (UCLouvain). He has also won the MIT Billard Award and ORSA George E. Kimball Medal for distinguished service.

== Work ==
Magnanti's teaching and research interests are in applied and theoretical aspects of large-scale optimization and operations research, specifically on the theory and application of large-scale optimization, particularly in the areas of network flows, nonlinear programming, and combinatorial optimization. He has conducted research on such topics as production planning and scheduling, transportation planning, facility location, logistics, and communication systems design. He is also known for pioneering an educational philosophy that combines engineering and management.

== Other awards ==
- Journal Networks: Glover-Klingman Prize| best paper published during the year (2005)
- 2002 class of Fellows of the Institute for Operations Research and the Management Sciences
- American Academy of Arts and Sciences: Fellow (2000)
- Operations Research Society of America: Lanchester Prize| Best Publication in Operations Research (1993)
- National Academy of Engineering: Member (1991)
- MIT: Irwin Sizer Award for Significant Innovations in MIT Education (2001)
- Linköping University: Honorary Doctorate
- University of Montreal: Honorary Doctorate
- Université Catholique de Louvain: Honorary Doctorate
- The Technion: Honorary Doctorate
- Syracuse University: Honorary Doctorate (2022)

== Publications ==
- Applied Mathematical Programming
- Network Flows: Theory, Algorithms and Applications
- Lagrange and Fenchel Duality Are Equivalent, Mathematical Programming, 7, 253–258, 1974.
- Network Design and Transportation Planning: Models and Algorithms (with R. T. Wong), Transportation Science, 18(1), 1-55, 1984.
- Extremum Properties of Hexagonal Partitioning and the Uniform Distribution in Euclidean Location (with M. Haimovich), SIAM Journal on Discrete Mathematics, (1), 50–64, February 1988.
- Separable Concave Optimization Approximately Equals Piecewise Linear Optimization (with Dan Stratila), IPCO Proceedings, Lecture Notes in Computer Science, 3064, 234–243, 2004.
- Strong Formulations for Network Design Problems with Connectivity Requirements (with S. Raghavan), Networks, 45 (2): 61–79, 2005.
- An Intersecting Tree Model for Odd-Diameter-Constrained Minimum Spanning and Steiner Trees (with Luis Gouveia and Cristina Requejo), Annals of Operations Research, 146: 19–39, 2006
- Variable Disaggregation in Network Flow Problems with Piecewise Linear Costs (with K. Croxton and B. Gendron), Operations Research 55 (1):146-157, 2007.
