= Jane Ammons =

American industrial engineer

Jane Chumley Ammons (born 1953) is an American industrial engineer known for her research on supply chain engineering and on the recycling of industrial goods, including carpet. She is the former chair of the H. Milton Stewart School of Industrial and Systems Engineering at Georgia Tech, the former president of the Institute of Industrial Engineers, and a professor emerita at Georgia Tech.

== Education and career ==
Ammons was the first woman to earn a Ph.D. in industrial engineering from Georgia Tech, in 1982. Her dissertation, A Generation Expansion Planning Model For Electric Utilities, was supervised by Leon McGinnis, and concerned generation expansion planning.

After completing her doctorate, she remained in industrial engineering at Georgia Tech as a faculty member, the department's first faculty member to be a woman. She was president of the Institute of Industrial Engineers for 2009–2010. When she was named chair of industrial engineering at Georgia Tech in 2011, she became the first woman to chair an engineering department at Georgia Tech. She retired in 2014.

== Recognition ==
Ammons was selected to become a Fellow of the Institute of Industrial Engineers in 2003. She won the inaugural WORMS Award for the Advancement of Women in Operations Research and Management Science in 2005. In 2014 she was given the top honor of the Institute of Industrial Engineers, the Frank and Lillian Gilbreth Industrial Engineering Award.
