= Transportation Science =

- Discipline: Transport
- Language: English
- Edited by: Michael Hewitt

Publication details
- History: 1967–present
- Publisher: Institute for Operations Research and the Management Sciences
- Frequency: Bimonthly
- Impact factor: 3.310 (2018)

Standard abbreviations
- ISO 4: Transp. Sci.

Indexing
- ISSN: 0041-1655 (print); 1526-5447 (web)

Links
- Journal homepage

Transportation Science is a bimonthly peer-reviewed academic journal published by the Institute for Operations Research and the Management Sciences (INFORMS). The studies published in the journal apply operations research techniques to problems in the full range of transportation sectors, including air travel, rail transport, commuter lines, and vehicular travel/traffic.
