= Georgia Perakis =

- Born: March 9, 1966 (age 60); Greece
- Citizenship: United States
- Education: Brown University, University of Athens, Greece
- Scientific career
- Fields: Operations research
- Workplaces: MIT Sloan School of Management
- Thesis: Geometric, interior point and classical methods for solving finite dimensional variational inequality problems (1993)
- Doctoral advisor: Thomas L. Magnanti
- Website: http://mitmgmtfaculty.mit.edu/gperakis/

Georgia Perakis is a Greek-American operations researcher and the William F. Pounds Professor of Operations Research and Operations Management at the Sloan School of Management. She is on leave from serving as Associate Dean of Social and Ethical Responsibilities of Computing at the MIT Schwarzman College of Computing, while serving as John C. Head III Dean at the MIT Sloan school of Management (interim). She is also the Codirector of the MIT Operations Research Center Massachusetts Institute of Technology (MIT), Cambridge, Massachusetts. Her research is primarily in the areas of dynamic pricing, revenue management and inventory control. In 2016, she was elected as a Fellow of the Institute for Operations Research and the Management Sciences (INFORMS) and in 2021 as Distinguished Fellow of the MSOM Society in recognition of her lifetime achievement in "variational inequalities, the price of anarchy, dynamic pricing and data analytics," and her "dedicated mentorship of a future generation of OR scholars."

== Personal life and education ==
Perakis was born and raised in Crete, Greece where she earned a bachelor's degree in mathematics from the University of Athens in 1987. She subsequently attended Brown University, where she received a master's degree in 1988 and a PhD in 1993, both in applied mathematics. She began her doctoral research under the supervision of Stella Constantine Dafermos. Following Dafermos' death in 1990, Perakis went on to work with Thomas L. Magnanti and completed her thesis titled "Geometric, Interior Point and Classical Methods for Solving Finite Dimensional Variational Inequality Problems."

== Career ==
Following her doctoral studies, Perakis continued in the Division of Applied Mathematics at Brown University as a visiting assistant professor. In 1995, she joined MIT as a postdoctoral associate at the Operations Research Center. In 1998, she was appointed as an assistant professor at the MIT Sloan School of Management. She was promoted to associate professor without tenure in the year 2002 and earned tenure in 2005. She became a full professor at the School in 2009. Between 2008 and 2015, she was the co-director of the MIT Sloan School of Management Leaders for Global Operations (LGO) Program. Between 2017-2022 she served as the faculty director of the Executive MBA program at MIT Sloan. In July 2019 she became the co-director of the Operations Research Center (interdepartmental PhD and Master’s program at MIT). She holds the title of William F. Pounds Professor of Management Science as of September 2009.

Perakis served on the editorial board of Management Science, Operations Research, Manufacturing & Service Operations Management and Productions and Operations Management, among others. Perakis is currently the Editor-in-Chief (EIC) of the M&SOM journal (Manufacturing & Service Operations Management). It is worth noting that Perakis is the first female to serve as EIC of a premier journal in Operations including Management Science, Operations Research, Manufacturing & Service Operations Management and Productions and Operations Management.

== Awards and recognition ==
Perakis has received numerous awards and distinctions over the course of her career, including the 2000 National Science Foundation CAREER Award, the 2000 PECASE Award (Presidential Early Career Award for Scientists and Engineers) for her "outstanding research on the development of a theory for understanding the nature of traffic equilibria, and for her commitment to undergraduate and graduate education," and Faculty awards by Adobe in 2017 and IBM in 2015 and 2016. In 2016, she was elected as a Fellow of INFORMS, the highest honor of the largest society of analytics professionals. In 2021, she was also elected as Distinguished fellow of the MSOM Society.
