= Ocean Renewable Power Company =

American renewable energy company

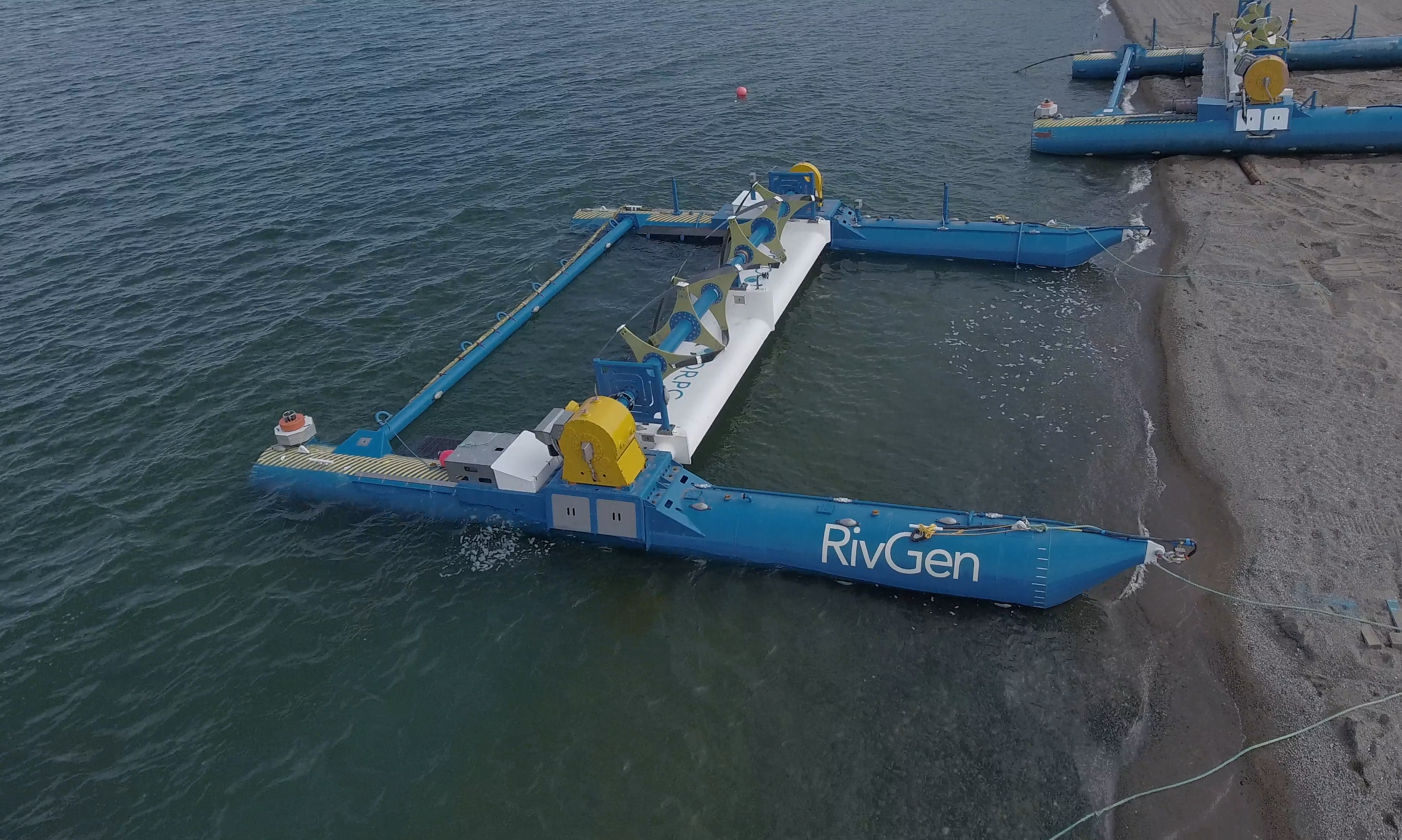
RivGen® devices, Igiugig, Alaska, August 2021, Igiugig Village Council and ORPC

Ocean Renewable Power Company (ORPC, Inc.) is an American marine renewable energy company based in Portland, Maine. The company develops technologies which generate electricity from tidal, river, and ocean currents. The turbines are a cross-flow design in the helix shape of DNA with the axis of rotation perpendicular to the flow of water and work on the same principle as water wheels. As water flows, the turbine foils spin in the same direction, producing mechanical power that a permanent magnet generator converts to electricity, and then sends to the electrical grid via an underwater power cable and onshore power station. The TidGen® Power System (for tidal currents) and RivGen® Power System (for river and shallow tidal currents) are the company's trademarked systems.

== History ==
The genesis of ORPC began in 2004, when a cruise ship industry executive, Paul Wells, queried whether there was a way to generate electricity from ocean currents like the Gulf Stream. He teamed up with two others, a structural engineer, Christopher R. Sauer, and a third co-founder with a financial background.

In 2007, with input from the U.S. Navy, ORPC launched a 46 ft long, horizontal cross-flow turbine prototype in Cobscook Bay, Maine, which proved technically feasible.

In 2010, the company's 60-kilowatt tidal turbine began providing grid-compatible electricity to the Eastport, Maine, U.S. Coast Guard station's utility boat.

ORPC pursued and won the first contract with the Maine Public Utilities Commission to provide up to 5 megawatts of tidal power in April 2012. ORPC will receive 21.5 cents per kilowatt-hour produced, which is higher than the fluctuating price paid to producers on the open electricity market. They determined that the economic benefits that would accrue to the state would be a factor of 1.8, meaning more money would be returned to the Maine economy through jobs and taxes than was being invested in the higher rate paid. Maine's state senate president, Kevin Raye, described the deal as a major milestone "in the 80-year effort to commercially harness the vast power of the tides”.

The company installed an underwater turbine to use tidal currents to generate renewable energy. The unit was installed on the ocean floor at the company's Federal Energy Regulatory Commission-licensed Cobscook Bay project site, in Eastport and Lubec, Maine. The project transmitted the first electricity ever delivered to a utility-scale grid from an ocean resource in North or South America in September 2012. A $21 million project, the Cobscook Bay Project was funded almost equally between private and public sources, with the United States Department of Energy providing a $10 million research grant. The project produced enough electricity for 25 homes. Said Jose Zayas, director of the Wind and Water Power Technologies Office at the Department of Energy, "These first pioneering projects are complicated (and) really breaking new ground." Said Paul Jacobson, an ocean energy expert at the Palo Alto, Calif.-based Electric Power Research Institute. "With this project, these tidal power devices have finally crossed the threshold into commercial development." "The project, which injected $14 million into the local economy and has supported more than 100 local and supply chain jobs, represents the first tidal energy project in the United States with long-term contracts to sell electricity."

Starting in 2013, ORPC submitted annual environmental monitoring reports for the Cobscook Bay Tidal Energy Project to the Federal Energy Regulatory Commission with findings from acoustic, marine mammal and fish species studies along with other environmental impacts, which the company indicated had no adverse impact on the marine environment of Cobscook Bay."

ORPC is developing the autonomous turbine generator unit (ATGU), a roving subsea power generation module capable of self-propelling, self-deploying and retrieving, and providing a power supply to subsea vehicles and monitoring systems, and performing underwater missions such as heavy lifts, inspections, and robotic operations. This project is supported by the US Department of Energy Advanced Research Projects Agency – Energy (ARPA-E) program.

Founder and CEO Christopher R. Sauer retired in 2020, after 16 years of service to the company. Stuart Davies now leads the company as CEO.

ORPC has expanded its operations globally, establishing three subsidiaries: ORPC Canada (Montreal, 2015), ORPC Ireland LLC (Dublin, 2015), and ORPC Chile SpA (Punta Arenas, 2021).

== Recognition ==
Along with 17 other high-tech small businesses and 3 individuals, ORPC received a Tibbetts Award from the U.S. Small Business Administration in Washington, D.C., in May 2013. The award honors companies and individuals nationwide, "who are beacons of promise and models of excellence in high technology."

ORPC was the first marine renewable company to receive the Outstanding Stewards of America's Waters Award for Operational Excellence from the National Hydropower Association in 2016.

In September 2020, Stuart Davies provided public testimony before the U.S. Senate Committee on Energy & Natural Resources Full Committee Hearing on Offshore Energy Technologies.

ORPC was honored as Innovator of the Year by the Maine International Trade Center in May 2021.

U.S. Secretary of Energy Jennifer Granholm and U.S. Senator Angus King visited ORPC headquarters in September 2021.

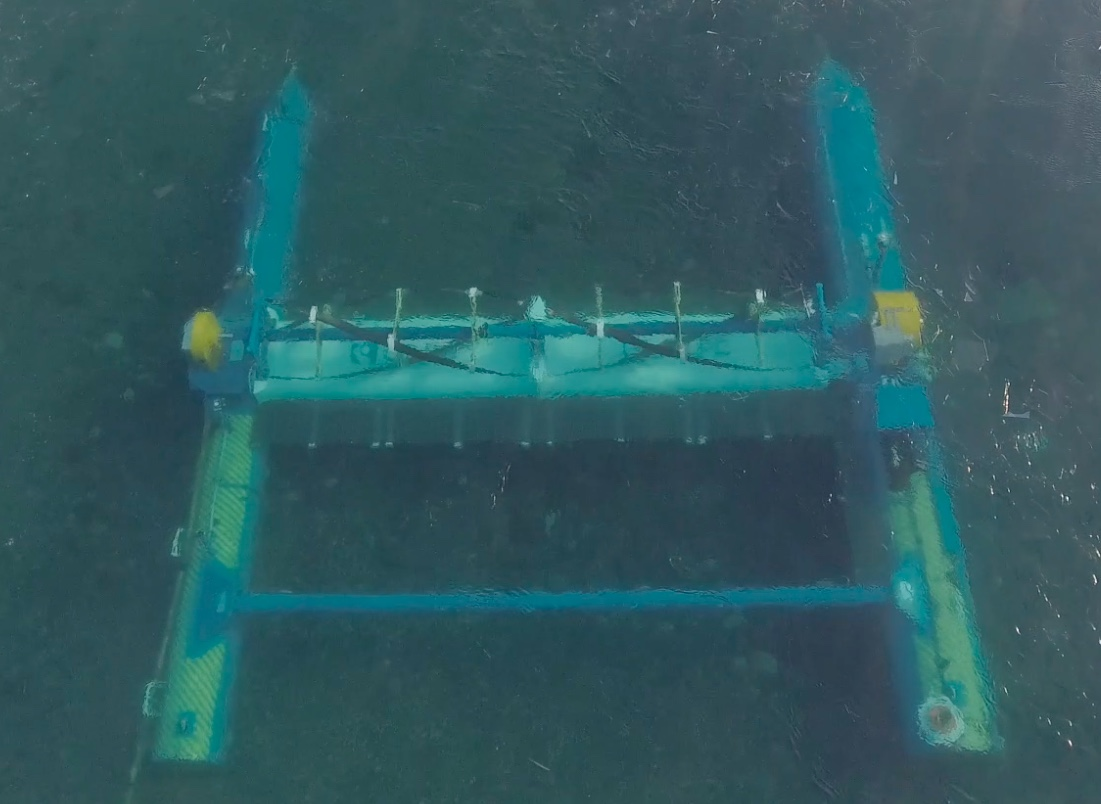
ORPC RivGen 2.0 Power System

== RivGen® Power System Development ==
In 2014, ORPC built and operated its RivGen Power System, the Company’s first river energy project, delivering power to the remote Alaskan village of Igiugig.

An updated RivGen Power System was re-installed and operated in Igiugig in 2015 to demonstrate its latest technology advancements and provided one-third of the community’s electricity needs, significantly offsetting their diesel fuel use.

In July 2019, ORPC deployed its commercial RivGen 2.0 Power System and connected it to the Igiugig community microgrid, generating 35 kW at this site.

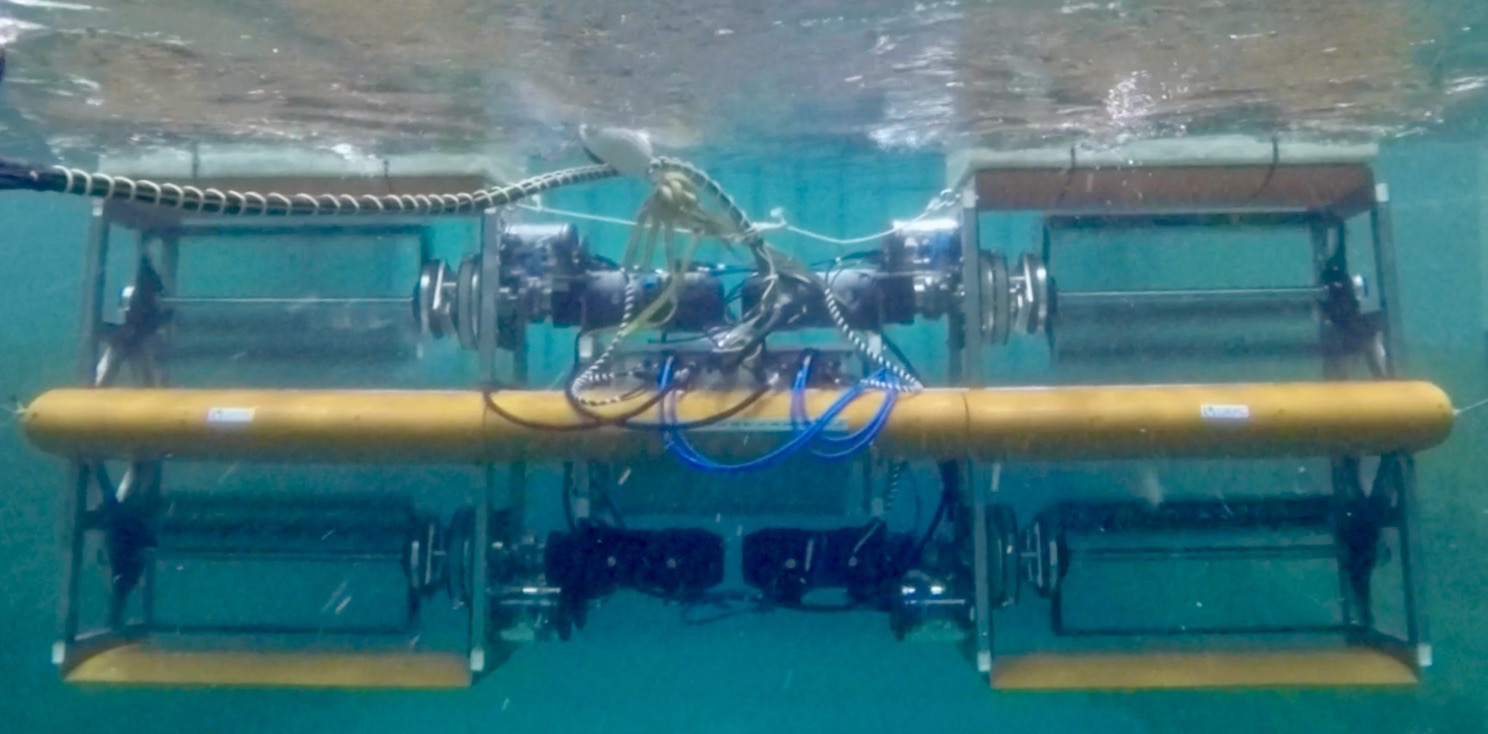
Test of ORPC's autonomous turbine generator unit (ATGU) prototype at University of Maine in 2020
