= Penn Kimball =

American journalist

Penn Townsend Kimball II (October 12, 1915 – November 8, 2013) was an American journalist and college professor at Columbia University, most notable for suing the American government in the mid-1980s after his discovery that the FBI and CIA considered him and his wife a security risk.

== Education and career ==
Kimball was one of three siblings, born to a middle-class family in New Britain, Connecticut. His father was an executive for a household goods manufacturer, his mother was a former elementary school teacher, and his older brother George E. Kimball went on to become a noted quantum chemist and operations researcher who also taught at Columbia University. Kimball was named after his grandfather, Penn Townsend Kimball, who had moved from Massachusetts to Chicago; Kimball's family moved from Chicago to New Britain before he was born. Kimball went to Lawrenceville School, graduated from Princeton University in 1937, and spent a year at Balliol College, Oxford as a Rhodes Scholar, earning a master's degree in politics and economics. He served in the Pacific as a Marine in World War II, becoming a captain.

His journalism career began in New York during the 1940s. During that era, he worked for numerous magazines and newspapers including The New Republic and the New York Times. He was an aide to governors Chester Bowles of Connecticut and W. Averell Harriman of New York. While still studying for a doctorate at Columbia University, he was hired as a journalism professor there in 1958. In the 1970s he worked with Edward Logue on urban renewal and wrote a report on the South Bronx, Areas of Strength, Areas of Opportunity. He was also an election consultant to the CBS network and a producer/writer for Omnibus. He retired from Columbia in 1985, after which he completed his a doctorate in political science from Columbia and became a fellow of the Woodrow Wilson Center in Washington, D.C.

== Security file and legal case ==
In 1977, after requesting his file under the Freedom of Information Act, Kimball discovered that the federal government had regarded him and his wife as a security risk on suspicion of Communist sympathies since the file was opened when he took the Foreign Service examination 30 years before, and that the information in his file was based on unsubstantiated anonymous reports. In 1984, Kimball filed a $10 million lawsuit against the federal government. His name was officially cleared in 1987 after the assistance of Senator Lowell P. Weicker of Connecticut and Kimball's agreement to drop the lawsuit. As of February 1, 2024, the Declaration of Louis J. Dube (the individual responsible for withholding select files from Kimball) was Declassified by the CIA.

== Books ==
Kimball published several books, including

- Bobby Kennedy and the New Politics (Prentice-Hall, 1968), a biography of written while Kennedy was running for President of the U.S. in 1968.
- The Disconnected (Columbia University Press, 1973), about institutionalized exclusion of the minority poor from the U.S. electoral system.
- The File (Harcourt Brace Jovanovich, 1983) about his security file. Frontline aired a documentary based on The File, "The Secret File", on April 14, 1987.
- ‘Keep Hope Alive!’: Super Tuesday and Jesse Jackson’s 1988 Campaign for the Presidency (University Press of America, 1991).
- Downsizing the News: Network Cutbacks in the Nation’s Capital (Woodrow Wilson Center Press, 1994).
