= Berna Dengiz =

Turkish industrial engineer

Berna Dengiz is a Turkish industrial engineer, the dean of engineering and professor of industrial engineering at Başkent University. Her research involves the heuristic optimization of complex systems.

== Education and career ==
Dengiz studied civil engineering as an undergraduate student at Gazi University, where she earned a bachelor's degree in 1974. She earned a master's degree in statistics in 1978 at Gazi University. In 1987 she earned both a second master's degree in statistics from Middle East Technical University, and a Ph.D. in industrial engineering from Gazi University.

She began working as an instructor in industrial engineering at Gazi University in 1985, and on completing her Ph.D. in 1987 was appointed as an assistant professor. She became associate professor in 1992 and full professor in 1998. In 2005 she moved to Başkent University as professor and chair of industrial engineering, and she became dean of engineering there in 2007.

== Recognition ==
Dengiz was the 2011 winner of the WORMS Award for the Advancement of Women in Operations Research and Management Science of the Institute for Operations Research and the Management Sciences (INFORMS).
