= 3C Institute =

3C Institute is a private, for-profit research and development company based in Durham, North Carolina, providing research, data collection, and program implementation support services. The 3C Institute also develops evidence-based social-emotional learning products for children, adolescents, and parents.

== Background ==
3-C Institute for Social Development was founded in 2001 by clinical psychologist Dr. Melissa DeRosier. The organization changed its name to 3C Institute in 2013. Dr. DeRosier received her doctorate from UNC-Chapel Hill in 1992 and completed a two-year fellowship at Duke University Medical Center. She then worked on a five-year federal grant examining bullying and violence prevention in the Wake County Public School System. She observed that teachers and schools were using non-evidence-based programs to improve social and emotional skills and founded the company to address this research-to-practice gap.

== Funding ==
3C received its first SBIR (Small Business Innovation Research) Phase I grants in 2002 and its first Phase II grant in 2003. The company has completed Phase I and Phase II grants and contracts funded through NIH (NICHD, NIDA, NIDCD, NIDILRR, NIMH, NIMHD, NIDDK, NHLBI, NCATS), the CDC, and the U.S. Department of Education.

== Awards ==
In 2011, 3C Institute received a Tibbetts Award from the U.S. Small Business Administration (SBA)for its evidence-based mental health programs. In 2014, the company received the Special Award of Excellence for Innovation and Social Entrepreneurship from the SBA, which highlights entrepreneurs who find unique and novel solutions to social problems.

== Products and Services ==
3C Institute has developed web- and game-based interventions to address child and adolescent behavioral and social problems. The company’s flagship product, Social Skills Group Intervention (S.S.GRIN), received recognition from the Substance Abuse and Mental Health Services Administration (SAMHSA) as a mental health promotion winner in 2010. The effectiveness of S.S.GRIN was proven by tracking 1,500 students over three years in 10 schools.

3C Institute also works with outside clients to develop professional development courses and programs to help researchers collect and translate data. In January 2025, the company commercialized Quest, a software platform for social, behavioral, and educational research.
