= Tibbetts Award =

American national award

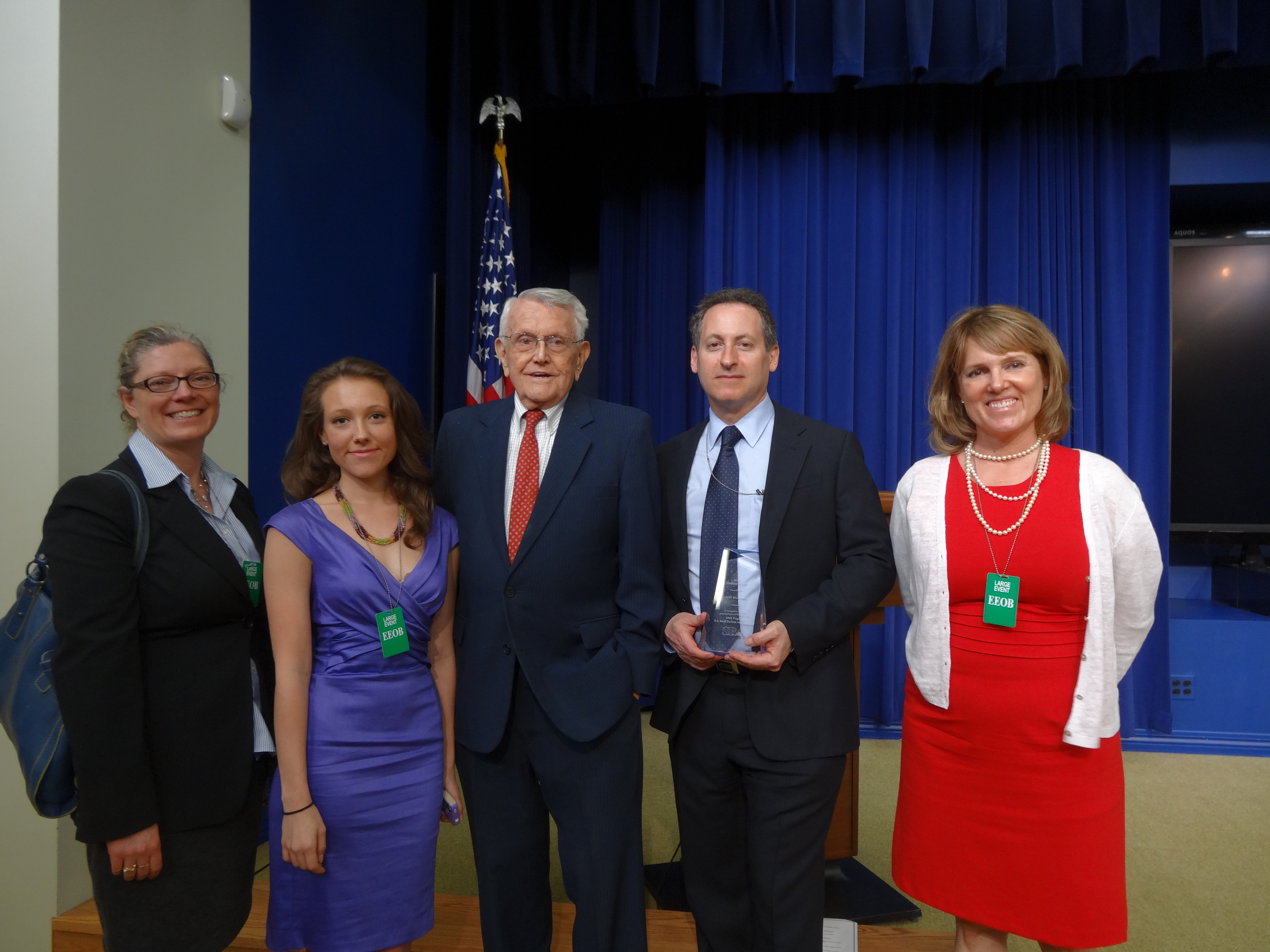
Tibbetts Award 2013. Roland Tibbetts in center.

The Tibbetts Award ("Tibbie") is an American award made annually to those small firms, projects, organizations, and individuals judged to exemplify the very best in Small Business Innovation Research (SBIR) achievement. The award was established in 1995 and the first awards were made in 1996. The award was named after Roland Tibbetts of the National Science Foundation.

Tibbetts Awards recognize accomplishments where, in the judgement of those closely involved and often most immediately affected, the stimulus of SBIR funding has made an important and definable difference.

== Selection ==
In selection for Tibbetts Awards, the focus is primarily on:

- Economic impact of technological innovation
- Business achievement and effective collaborations
- Demonstrated state and regional impact and proven support

Tibbetts "Hall of Fame" awards were first presented in 2011, to recognize small businesses that "exemplify notable lifetime achievement in innovation research and that have achieved extraordinary success as a result of the SBIR program."

== Hiatus and return ==
In 2007 the Tibbetts award went on hiatus and was not awarded for the years 2008, 2009, and 2010. In 2011, forty-four companies and eight individuals were selected to receive the award. Tibbets Awards were awarded to businesses ranging from medical device companies such as MedShape Solutions, to electronics manufacturers such as Qualcomm, Inc, and to nanobiotechnology companies such as ANP Technologies. Following 2016, the award again went on hiatus and was not awarded for the years 2017, 2018, and 2019. It returned in 2020 when 38 companies received the Tibbetts award as well as 14 individuals.

== About the SBIR Program ==
The SBIR program awards United States Federal Government funds to small businesses to develop innovative technologies that address important national priorities. Individual agencies set aside a fraction of their research and development funds for the program and competitively award contracts to those firms that propose the best strategies to solve solicitation topics. The topics are chosen to address technical issues that each agency considers important. Roland Tibbetts began the SBIR program as a tiny experimental project at the National Science Foundation. Today, the SBIR program has developed more than $21 billion worth of research by more than 15,000 firms—resulting in more than 45,000 patents. SBIR companies employ more than 400,000 scientists and engineers—making the program the largest concentration of scientific and engineering talent in the United States, exceeding the combined total of all American academic and non-profit institutions. Each year, 11 federal agencies award $2 billion in research contracts as part of the SBIR program.

== Past winners ==
2016

Winner	Location
Made In Space, Inc.	Mountain View, CA
EnChroma	Berkeley, CA

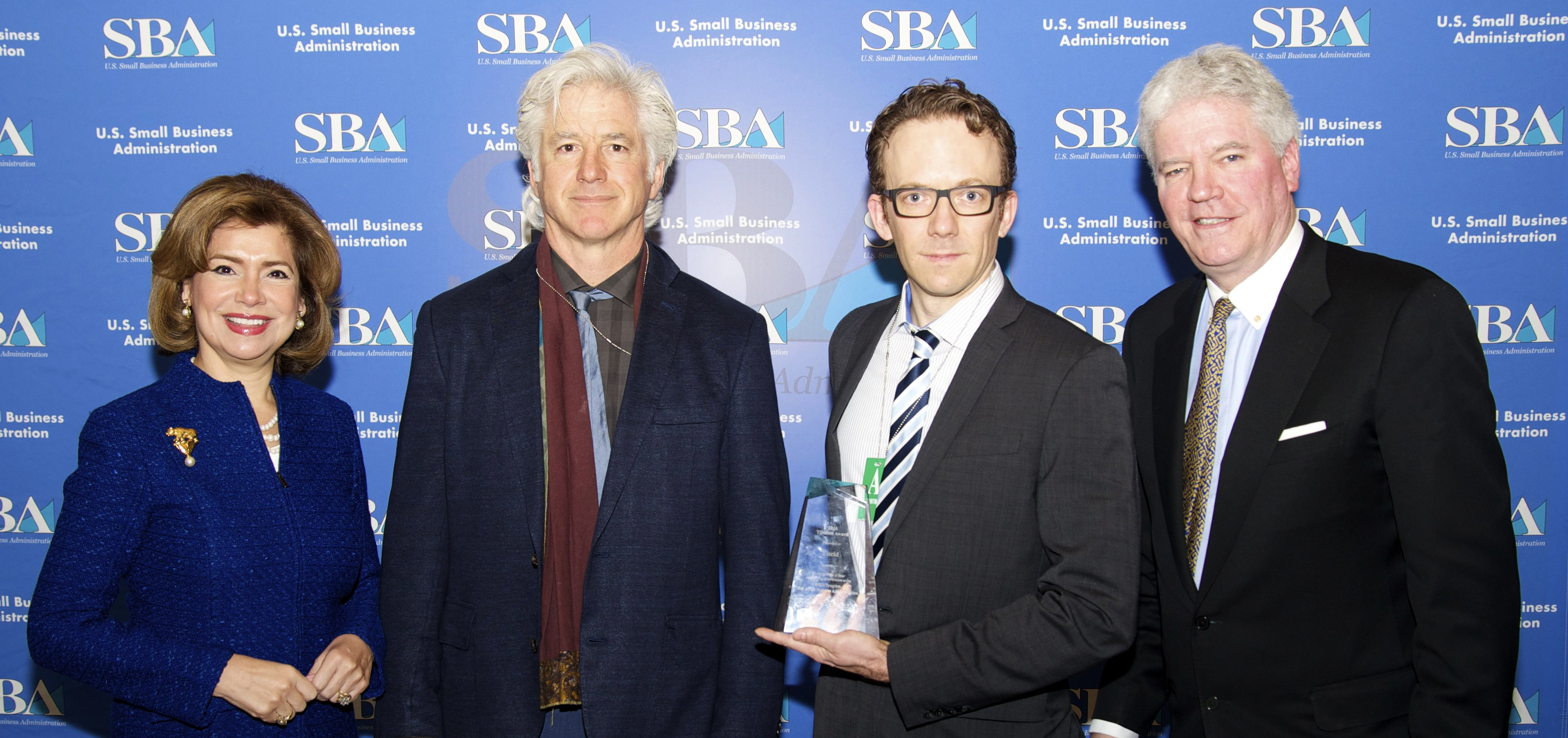
EnChroma's Don McPherson and Andy Schmeder, second and third from left - Accept Tibbetts Award

2015

Winner	Location
Bioo Scientific	Austin, TX
Precision Combustion, Inc.	North Haven, Connecticut

2014

Winner	Company
Eric Schmidt & Kevin Mahaffy	Exquadrum, Inc

Winner	Location
Sentient Science	Buffalo, NY
QorTek Inc.	Williamsport, PA

2013

Winner	Location
Harmonia Holdings Group, LLC	Blacksburg, VA
MBF Bioscience	Williston, VT
ORPC, Inc.	Portland, ME
TiER1 Performance Solutions	Covington, KY

2011

Winner	Location
Wyatt Technology Corp.	Santa Barbara, CA
Williams-Pyro, Inc.	Fort Worth, Texas
3C Institute	Cary, NC
SA Photonics	Los Gatos, CA

2010

Winner	Location
Network Foundation Technologies (NiFTy)	Ruston, La.
ANP Technologies	Newark, Del.
Vecna Technologies, Inc.	Cambridge, Mass.
Fiber Materials	Biddeford, Maine

2007

Winner	Company
Eric Adolphe, Esq	OPTIMUS Corporation
Houston Baker	National Cancer Institute
Mark E. Bakotic	Northrop Grumman Ship Systems
Pallabi Saboo	Harmonia Holdings Group, LLC
James I. Finley	Deputy Undersecretary of Defense (A&T)
James Nolan	Decisive Analytics Corporation
Patty Forbes	Formerly Senate Committee on Small Business
Thomas Knight	Invistics Corporation

2006

Winner	Company
Allen Baker	Vital Strategies, Inc.
Stephen Guilfoos	Air Force, Air Force Research Laboratory (AFRL)
Patrick Guire	Innovative Surface Technologies, Inc.
Richard Hendel	Boeing Company
Mahendra Jain	Kentucky Science & Engineering Foundation
Ronald Ignatius	Quantum Devices, Inc.

1998

Winner	Location
Electronic Concepts and Engineering, Inc	Holland, Ohio
Precision Combustion, Inc.	North Haven, Connecticut
