= INFORMS Journal on Applied Analytics =

- Discipline: Operations research
- Language: English
- Edited by: Alexandra Newman

Publication details
- Former name(s): Interfaces
- History: 1970-present
- Publisher: Institute for Operations Research and the Management Sciences
- Frequency: Bimonthly
- Impact factor: 0.729 (2018)

Standard abbreviations
- ISO 4: INFORMS J. Appl. Anal.

Indexing
- ISSN: 0092-2102 (print); 1526-551X (web)
- LCCN: 74646164
- OCLC no.: 781448734

Links
- Journal homepage; Online access; Online archive

INFORMS Journal on Applied Analytics is a bimonthly peer-reviewed academic journal about operations research that was established in 1970 under the title Interfaces by The Institute of Management Sciences, now part of the Institute for Operations Research and the Management Sciences. The journal has a case-study style: it offers examples of how operations research theory has been applied in businesses and organizations.

An annual feature is an issue with papers by the previous year's Franz Edelman Award participants.

The journal was published quarterly from 1970 to 1982.
