= The Light of the World (Boucher) =

Painting by François Boucher

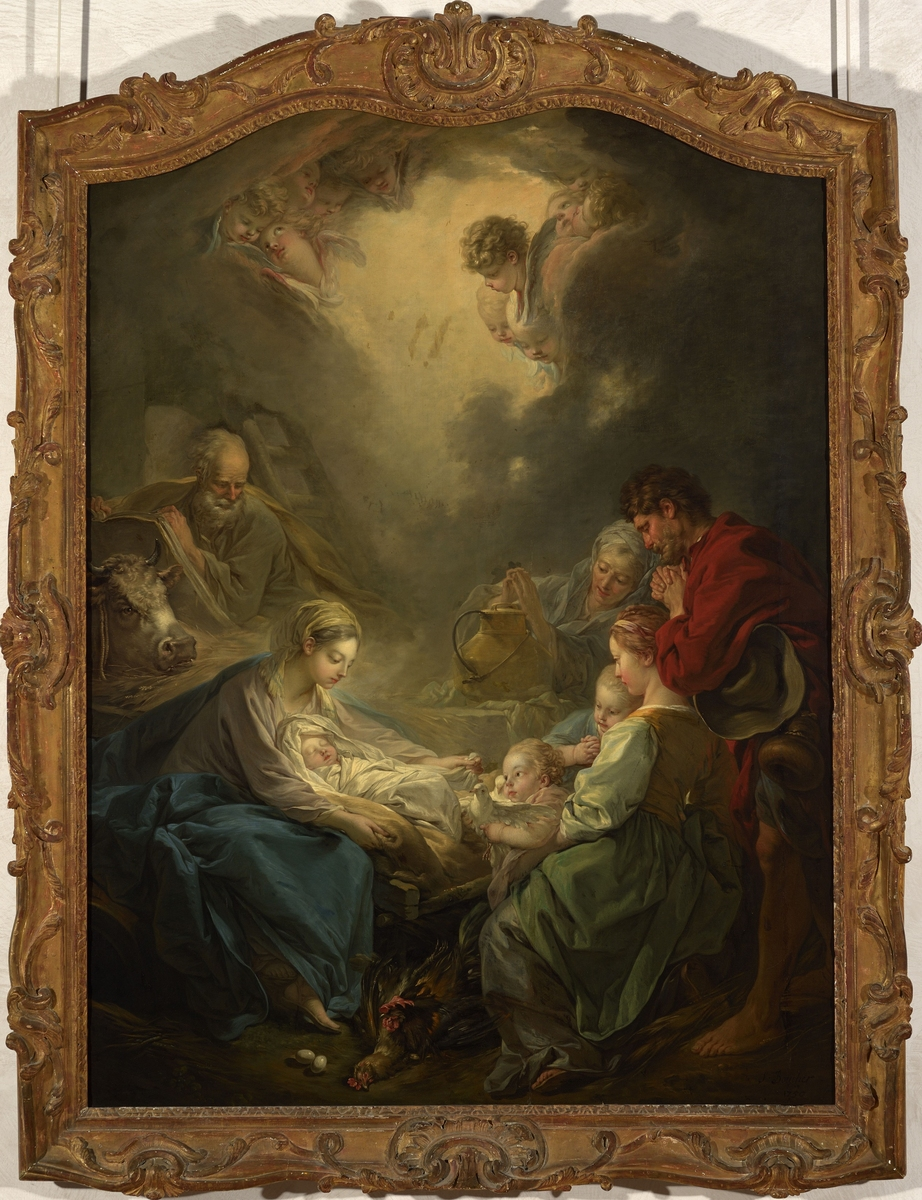
- Artist: François Boucher
- Year: 1750
- Medium: oil on canvas
- Dimensions: 175 cm × 130 cm (69 in × 51 in)
- Location: Musée des beaux-arts de Lyon, Lyon

The Light of the World is a 1750 oil-on-canvas painting by the French artist François Boucher, currently housed in the Musée des beaux-arts de Lyon. Commissioned by Madame de Pompadour, the chief mistress of King Louis XV, it marked Boucher's first major foray into religious subject matter. Originally titled The Adoration of the Shepherds, it was exhibited at the Paris Salon in 1750, where its success secured Boucher a commission to paint a room in the Louvre and the prestigious position of First Painter to the King.

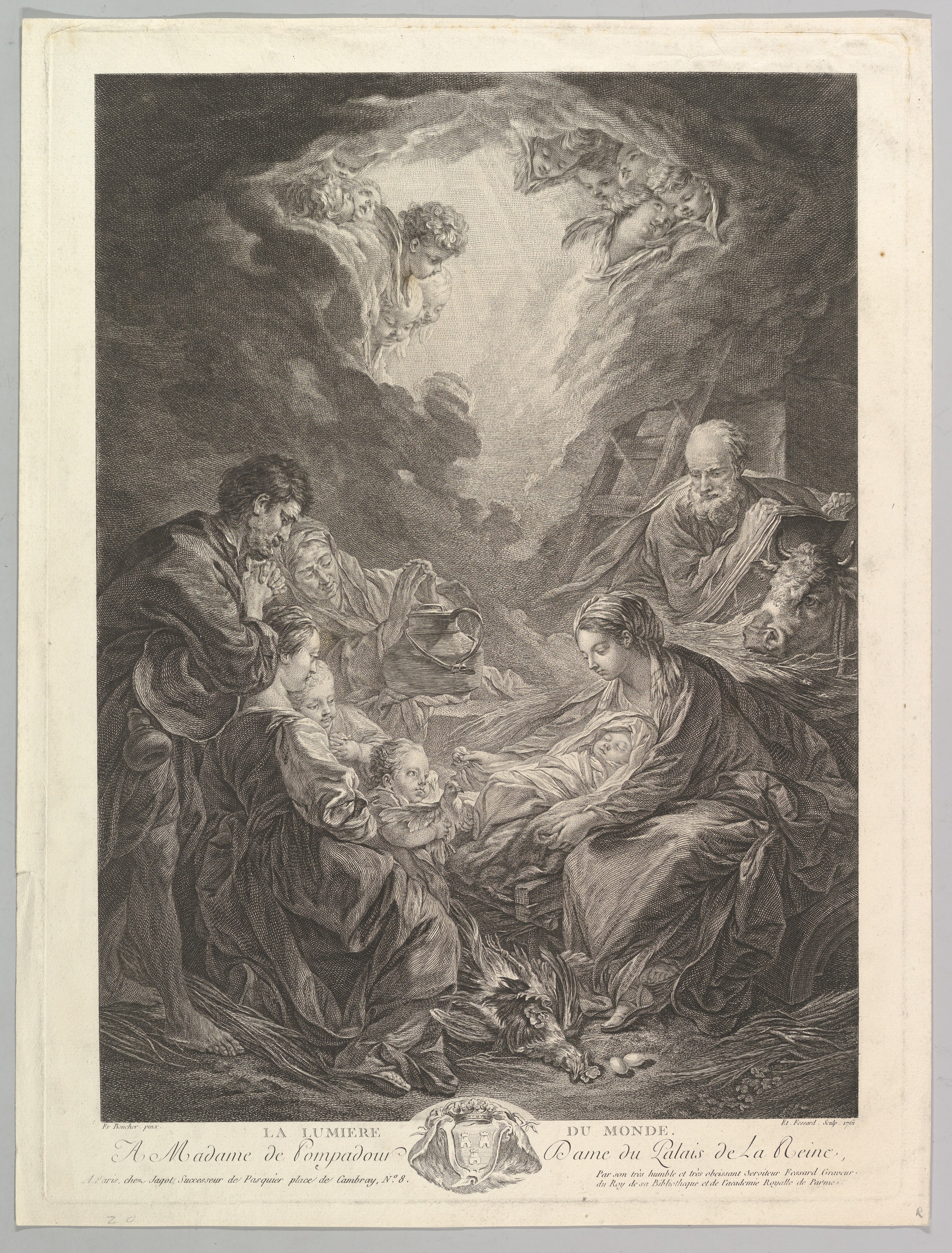
Étienne Fessard, after François Boucher, The Light of the World, 1761

Unlike traditional religious altarpieces, Boucher's work was placed in a more intimate and decorative setting, on the altar in one of the ante-chambers of the Château de Bellevue. This placement reflected a shift in the function and display of sacred art within elite private spaces. In 1761, Étienne Fessard engraved the painting, giving the title The Light of the World by which it is known today. The painting left the Château between 1762 and 1764, passing through several collections before being assigned to the Louvre by the Office des Biens et Intérêts privé in 1951. Four years later, it was transferred to the Musée des beaux-arts de Lyon, where it remains.

The painting presents a detailed and spiritually expressive interpretation of Christ's birth, distinguished by its notable Rococo style. Rather than adhering to traditional Nativity iconography and characters, Boucher fills the scene with a diverse array of characters bathed in the light of Christ. This divine glow from Christ draws heavily from the Gospels of Luke and John and transforms the work into a reflection on how Christ serves as the light for all humanity.

== Description ==
François Boucher's The Light of the World displays an intricate and serene religious scene, emphasizing the divine radiance of light during Christ's birth. At the center of the piece is the Virgin Mary, clothed in blue and white garments and gently cradling baby Jesus. Jesus's presence serves as the primary light source in the work, and his glow bathes the surrounding figures: adoring shepherds, a watchful Joseph, and other onlookers. Overhead, cherubic angels peer down from the soft, billowing clouds to enhance the celestial atmosphere.

== Interpretation ==
The subjects represented in Boucher's painting set it apart from traditional Nativity scenes. Some classic elements such as the shepherds and donkey are missing. Instead, the witnesses of the birth represent all stages of life, from young children to older adults. The man in red carries a hat and a water gourd. Both objects suggest he may be a pilgrim. To the left, Joseph is portrayed as an older man holding scripture. The presence of Joseph, the boy with a dove in his arms, and the older woman recalls the moment of the Purification.

The ox is St. Luke's symbol, alluding to the Gospel and representing sacrifice. Boucher's intent behind the hen and eggs remains uncertain. They may symbolize Christ's light and resurrection, or perhaps simply reinforce the rustic setting of the Nativity. Visually, the infant Jesus is the main light source in the piece.

Through these artistic choices, Boucher conveys that Christ's birth brought light for all people, regardless of age, wealth, or status. Boucher's unique interpretation of the Nativity ultimately made the piece suitable only for a private chapel.

== Style and techniques ==
The painting, done in the Rococo style, features unreal, theatrical lighting and uses the chiaroscuro technique to heighten its spiritual message. The dramatic contrast between light and dark emphasizes the divine illumination descending from the heavens onto the figure of Christ. This sacred illumination radiates outward, softly illuminating the surrounding figures, particularly Mary and Joseph, symbolizing the spread of divine presence into the world. At the same time, the scene conveys a distinctly rural atmosphere, reflecting the decorative tastes of Madame de Pompadour and aligning with the bucolic aesthetic of her Château de Bellevue.

== Biblical influences ==
While the Virgin Mary and Jesus were popular subjects for many artists, they had not been a focus of Boucher's work to this point. The Light of the World was his first devotional painting, and he approached it with notable creative freedom, enabled in part by Madame de Pompadour's lack of religious conservatism. As a result, the work defies easy categorization—the inclusion of additional figures suggests it is more than a simple Nativity scene, and there is no single Biblical narrative that fully accounts for its composition.

The most direct scriptural connections come from the Gospels of Luke and John. The references to the Gospel emphasize Christ's sacrificial role. Boucher's portrayal of Christ as a light for all humanity draws heavily from the story of Purification in Luke 2, when Simeon and Anna recognize the infant Jesus as the Messiah. Guided by the Holy Spirit, Simeon declares:

Sovereign Lord, as you have promised,

you may now dismiss your servant in peace.

For my eyes have seen your salvation,

which you have prepared in the sight of all nations:

a light for revelation to the Gentiles,

and the glory of your people Israel. (Luke 2:29-32)

This proclamation of Jesus as “a light for revelation to the Gentiles,” appears to be a direct source of inspiration for Boucher's painting. The theme is further reinforced in John 1:9, which describes Christ as "the true light that gives light to everyone was coming into the world." Though Boucher's scene does conform to conventional artistic representations of Biblical storytelling, these Gospel passages clearly shape its central message.

== Artistic influences ==
Antoine Bret, in his obituary for Boucher, noted that The Light of the World may reflect the influence of Italian Baroque painter Carlo Maratta. Like Maratta, Boucher bridges the divine and the human by depicting idealized figures modeled on humble subjects. The painting also echoes Maratta's distinctive use of artificial lighting and heightened clarity through the use of chiaroscuro.
