= Steven Nahmias =

American professor operations management

- Born: 1945 (age 80–81)
- Education: Queens College (B.A.), magna cum laud Columbia University (B.S.), magna cum laud Northwestern University (PhD)
- Known for: Perishable inventory theory Production and Operations Analysis (1989–2015)
- Awards: Fellow of the INFORMS Society; Fellow of the MSOM Society
- Scientific career
- Fields: Operations research Operations management Industrial engineering
- Workplaces: University of Pittsburgh (1972–1978); Stanford University (1978–1979); Santa Clara University (1979–present)
- Website: https://www.scu.edu/business/omis/faculty/nahmias/

Steven Nahmias (born 1945) is an American author and professor of operations management at Santa Clara University. He is best known for his contributions to inventory theory, and, in particular, perishable inventory theory. He is also the author of Production and Operations Analysis, a preeminent text in the field. He is currently an Honorary Fellow of INFORMS and MSOM.

== Life and career ==
Nahmias received his B.A. from Queens College in pre-engineering with emphasis in mathematics and physics and a B.S. from Columbia University in Industrial Engineering (operations research option) both in 1968. He then earned M.S. and PhD degrees in Operations Research from Northwestern University in 1971 and 1972 respectively. In 1972 he joined the Industrial Engineering Department at the University of Pittsburgh where he remained until 1978. During the academic year 1978–1979 he taught in the Operations Research Department at Stanford University, and since 1979 has been part of the Operations Management and Information Systems Department at Santa Clara University.

Nahmias is best known for his ground-breaking work on modeling the management of fixed life perishable inventories. Since 1972 he has published 18 publications on this problem. Extensions of the basic model include inclusion of a fixed charge, random lifetimes, one-for-one policies, and many others. He also has 19 additional publications on other inventory problems, and an additional 10 publications on problems in stochastic modeling of a variety of problems including contributions to fuzzy set theory, radioactive pharmaceuticals management, modeling the spread of AIDS, and others.

Nahmias is the author of Production and Operations Analysis. The first edition was published in 1989 by Richard D. Irwin. Subsequently, Richard D. Irwin was subsequently acquired by McGraw-Hill, who published editions three through six. During that time, the book was translated into Hebrew, Chinese and Spanish. The current edition (seventh) is co-authored with Tava Olsen of the University of Auckland and is published by Waveland Press. The text has been used at hundreds of universities throughout the world, and is the de facto standard among quantitative operations management texts. He is also the author of the book Perishable Inventory Systems published by Springer in 2011.

== Awards and honors ==
- First place in George Nicholson Student Paper Competition sponsored by the Operations Research Society of America (1971)
- Second place in TIMS (The Institute of Management Sciences) student paper competition (1972).
- Member of Alpha Pi Mu, Sigma Xi, and Omega Rho Honoraries
- Santa Clara University Award for Sustained Excellence in Research (1998)
- Deans Award for Excellence in Research (1982, 1985)
- Director of the Competitive Manufacturing Institute at Santa Clara University (1991–1998)
- Elected Fellow of Manufacturing & Service Operations Management Society (2011)
- Elected Fellow of INFORMS Society (2014)

== Personal life ==
In addition to his academic work, Nahmias is an accomplished jazz trumpeter. He performs regularly with several bands in the Bay Area.

== Publications ==
- Nahmias, Steven; Schmidt, Charles (1986). "An Application of the Theory of Weak Convergence to the Dynamic Perishable Inventory Problem With Discrete Demand". Mathematics of Operations Research. 11: 62–69. doi:10.1287/moor.11.1.62.
- Schmidt, Charles; Nahmias, Steven (1985). "(S-1, S) Policies for Perishable Inventories". Management Science. 31: 719–728. doi:10.1287/mnsc.31.6.719.
- Nahmias, Steven (1982). "Perishable Inventory Theory: A Review". Operations Research. 30 (4): 680–708. doi:10.1287/opre.30.4.680. PMID 10298625.
- Nahmias, Steven; Wang, Shan Shan (1979). "A Heuristic Lot Size Reorder Point Model for Decaying Inventories". Management Science. 25: 90–97. doi:10.1287/mnsc.25.1.90.
- Nahmias, Steven (1977). "On Ordering Perishable Inventory When Both the Demand and Lifetime Are Random". Management Science. 24 (1): 82–90. doi:10.1287/mnsc.24.1.82.
- Nahmias, Steven; Pierskalla, William (1976). "A Two Product Perishable/Non-Perishable Inventory Problem". SIAM Journal on Applied Mathematics. 30 (3): 483–500. doi:10.1137/0130045.
- Nahmias, Steven (1976). "Myopic Approximations for the Perishable Inventory Problem". Management Science. 22 (9): 1002–1008. doi:10.1287/mnsc.22.9.1002.
