= MBF Bioscience =

Biotechnology Company

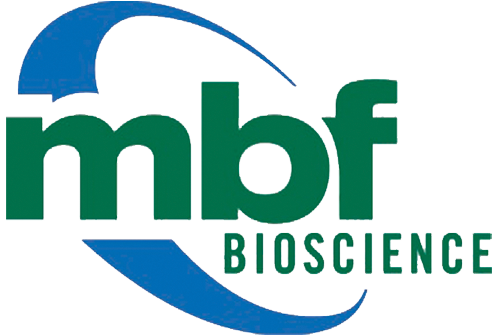
- Formerly: MicroBrightField
- Type: Private
- Industry: Biomedical
- Founded: 1988 (as MicroBrightField, Inc.)
- Headquarters: Williston, Vermont, USA
- Website: MBF Bioscience

MBF Bioscience is a biotech company that develops microscopy software and hardware for bioscience research and education. MBF Bioscience’s primary location is Williston, Vermont, United States and has offices that market, sell, and support its line of hardware and software products throughout North America, Europe, and Asia.

== History ==
The company was founded in 1988 as MicroBrightField, Inc. by Dr. Edmund Glaser and his son Jack Glaser. Their goal was to develop neuroanatomical image software for the research community. The company changed its name from MicroBrightField, Inc. to MBF Bioscience in 2005 to reflect their expansion of products. Currently, MBF Bioscience provides software and hardware solutions for stereology, neuron and vessel reconstruction, whole slide imaging, brain mapping, C. elegans tracking, 2-photon microscopy, fiber photometry, and light sheet imaging, supporting researchers in neuroscience and related fields.. The company's products are used in a variety of fields including stem cell research, cancer research, neuroanatomical studies, lung, kidney, reproductive, cardiac and toxicology research.

In 2021, MBF Bioscience acquired Vidrio Technologies, a provider of software and hardware components for laser scanning and two-photon microscopes.

In 2023, MBF Bioscience acquired Neurophotometrics LLC. (NPM), a company specializing in optical equipment.

== Awards ==
- NIH SBIR's Small Business Success Stories
- Tibbetts Award – 2013
- Best Places to Work in Vermont in 2007, 2009 and 2010.
- 2007 Vermont Small Business Person of the Year – Business Administration, which was presented to MBF Bioscience's co-founder Jack Glaser in 2007.
- Microscopy Today Innovation Award 2025, awarded to the SLICE Light Sheet Microscope

== Offices ==
MBF Bioscience's main locations are in Williston, Vermont, Ashburn, Virginia and San Diego, California. It also has offices to sell and support its line of products in the Netherlands (Delft), South Korea (Gyeonggi-do), and Japan (Shiroi-shi, Chiba).

== Products ==
Neurolucida (1988): A microscope system that creates and quantifies neuron reconstructions, allowing scientists to quantitatively analyze dendrites, axons, nodes, and synapses. Neuroscientists use this software for research in neurodegenerative diseases, neuropathy, memory, behavior, and ophthalmology.

Stereo Investigator (1995): An unbiased stereology system that uses different stereological probes to perform quantitative analysis of tissue specimens. Stereo Investigator is used in research fields such as neuroscience, pulmonary research, cancer research, and toxicology.

Neurolucida 360 (2015): Neurolucida 360 software automatically creates and quantifies neurons, allowing scientists to see and analyze dendrites, axons, nodes, and synapses. Neurolucida 360 works with 3D and 2D images. Neuroscientists use this software for research in neurodegenerative diseases, neuropathy, memory, behavior, and ophthalmology.

Biolucida (2011): Created to help share microscope images online and make image management easier for universities and medical institutions, among others. Biolucida is used in medical schools around the world to teach histopathology.

WormLab (2012): This software tracks the movement of C. elegans, a model organism widely used in research. WormLab is used in research fields such as neurodegeneration, genetics, aging, development, and toxicology.

BrainMaker (2015): This software combines serial sections of whole slide images to create full resolution 3D reconstructions of the entire brain (or other organ). BrainMaker is used in cell mapping and cytoarchitectonics.

NeuroInfo (2018): This software automatically delineates, identifies and maps brain regions into a common coordinate system, such as the Allen Mouse Brain Reference Atlas and Waxholm Rat Brain Atlas. Researchers use this software for neurogenomics, transcriptomics, proteomics, and connectomics.

MicroDynamix (2020): This software allows researchers to visualize and quantify changes in dendritic spine morphology over a period of time from repeated imaging experiments.

MicroFile+ (2020): This software converts microscope image files from most commercial microscope providers into the more space efficient, faster-loading JPEG2000 format and helps enrich the metadata of microscopy image data.

Vesselucida: This microscope system creates and quantifies vasculature reconstructions. Neuroscientists use this software for research in vasculature diseases.

Vesselucida 360 (2018): Vesselucida 360 is used to reconstruct vessels and microvasculature in 3D and obtain data about the length, connections, and complexity of microvessels. Vesselucida 360 is used in research fields such as cancer, diabetes, strokes, and other conditions that affect microvasculature.

ClearScope (2020): This is a light sheet theta microscope system invented by Dr. Raju Tomer at Columbia University. ClearScope allows researchers to image cleared tissue from large specimens.

Vesalius: This is a resonant scanning laser confocal system that allows 2D and 3D imaging for mounted and cleared tissue specimens.

SLICE (2024): A projected light sheet microscope (pLSM) that allows for 3D imaging and analysis of cleared biological samples. It received the 2025 Microscopy Today Innovation Award for its novel design and impact on the field of light sheet microscopy, offering advanced 3D imaging capabilities.
