= Sharon Arroyo =

American applied mathematician

Sharon Filipowski Arroyo
- Born: 1966 (age 59–60)
- Education: Stanford University; Cornell University
- Occupations: Applied mathematician, operations researcher

Sharon Filipowski Arroyo (born 1966) is an American applied mathematician and operations researcher who works for Boeing as a Boeing Technical Fellow. She works in the Applied Mathematics Group of Boeing Research and Technology on mathematical optimization applications in aircraft manufacturing and management.

== Education ==
Arroyo's favorite subject since first grade was math and she went on to major in mathematics at Stanford University, advised by Ralph Louis Cohen. She then attended Cornell University for graduate study, and completed her Ph.D. in 1993 with the dissertation Towards a Computational Complexity Theory that uses Approximate Data and Knowledge supervised by James Renegar.

== Career ==
Arroyo is part of the 43-member Applied Mathematics Group at Boeing's Research and Technology group where she works with Boeing's engineers to develop mathematical algorithms and tools that they can use to reduce costs and contracting costs and the improve company's product designs. In the course of her work, she works with "all aspects of the mathematical problem solving process" from defining problem requirements to developing mathematical formulations, constructing and implementing algorithms and delivering tools and supporting analysis.

She has provided mathematics support on a wide variety of Boeing projects including airline scheduling, supply chain logistics, transportation scheduling, production issues, communications networks, scheduling for in-flight refueling and sensor scheduling.

== Service and recognition ==
Arroyo is vice president for industry of the Society for Industrial and Applied Mathematics (SIAM). She was elected to the 2022 Class of SIAM Fellows, "for leadership in, promotion of, and contributions to the industrial practice of operations research". She was a 2019 winner of the WORMS Award for the Advancement of Women in Operations Research and Management Science.

She is also a member of the Steering Committee of the BIG Math Network.

== Selected publications ==
- Dennis, J. E., Sharon F. Arroyo, Evin J. Cramer, and Paul D. Frank. "Problem formulations for systems of systems." In 2005 IEEE International Conference on Systems, Man and Cybernetics, vol. 1, pp. 64–71. IEEE, 2005.
- Arroyo, Sharon F., Evin J. Cramer, John E. Dennis, and Paul D. Frank. "Comparing problem formulations for coupled sets of components." Optimization and Engineering 10, no. 4 (2009): 557-573.
- Thunemann, P. Zack, Raju Mattikalli, Sharon Arroyo, and Paul Frank. "Characterizing the tradeoffs between different sensor allocation and management algorithms." In 2009 12th International Conference on Information Fusion, pp. 1473–1480. IEEE, 2009.
- Delage, Erick, Sharon Arroyo, and Yinyu Ye. "The Value of Stochastic Modeling in Two-Stage Stochastic Programs."
