= Sběř =

- Municipality
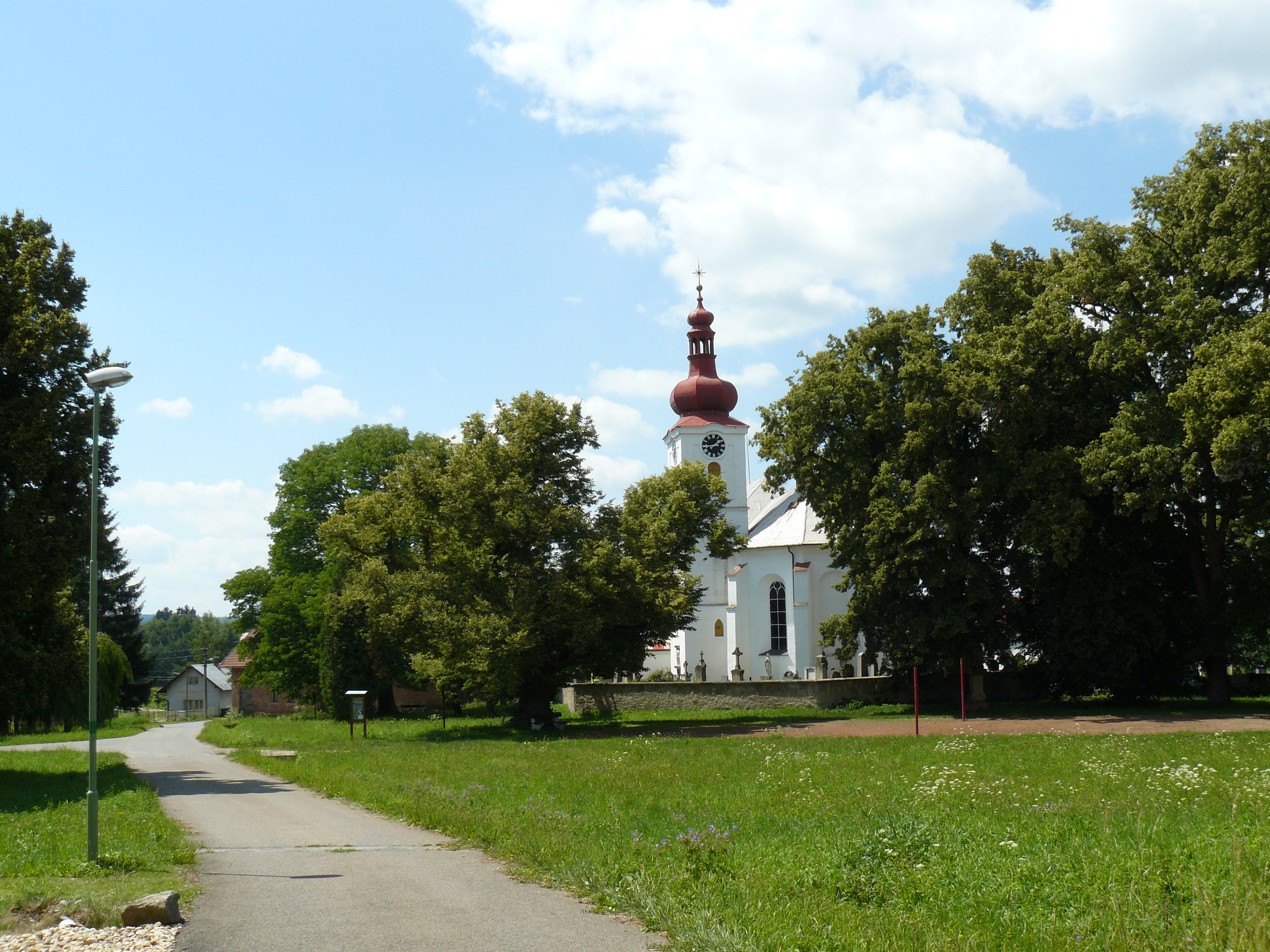
- Church of the Assumption of the Virgin Mary

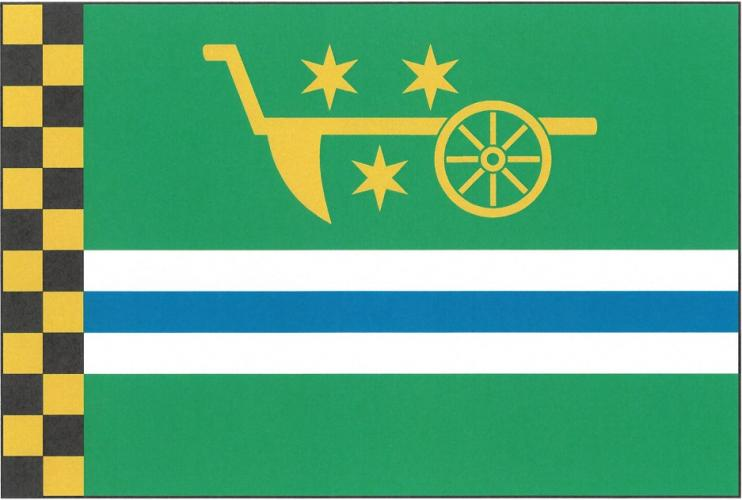
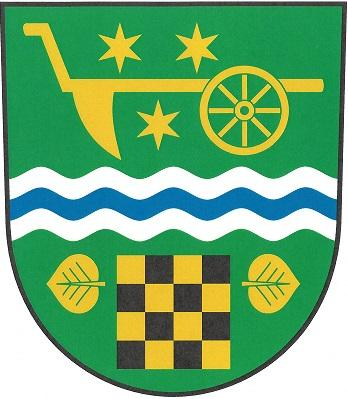
- Flag Coat of arms

- Location in the Czech Republic
- Coordinates: 50°19′13″N 15°25′28″E
- Country: Czech Republic
- Region: Hradec Králové
- District: Jičín
- First mentioned: 1332

Area
  - Total: 9.08 km^{2} (3.51 sq mi)
- Elevation: 246 m (807 ft)

Population (2026-01-01)
  - Total: 326
  - Density: 35.9/km^{2} (93.0/sq mi)
- Time zone: UTC+1 (CET)
  - Summer (DST): UTC+2 (CEST)
- Postal code: 507 03
- Website: obec-sber.cz

Sběř is a municipality and village in Jičín District in the Hradec Králové Region of the Czech Republic. It has about 300 inhabitants.

== Administrative division ==
Sběř consists of three municipal parts (in brackets population according to the 2021 census):

- Sběř (237)
- Hrobičany (66)
- Velešice (27)

== Demographics ==
Historical population
| Year | Pop. | ±% |
|---|---|---|
| 1869 | 1,091 | — |
| 1880 | 1,101 | +0.9% |
| 1890 | 1,038 | −5.7% |
| 1900 | 971 | −6.5% |
| 1910 | 996 | +2.6% |
| 1921 | 946 | −5.0% |
| 1930 | 840 | −11.2% |
| 1950 | 577 | −31.3% |
| 1961 | 508 | −12.0% |
| 1970 | 403 | −20.7% |
| 1980 | 353 | −12.4% |
| 1991 | 287 | −18.7% |
| 2001 | 246 | −14.3% |
| 2011 | 249 | +1.2% |
| 2021 | 330 | +32.5% |
Source: Censuses
