= Nanoscale Research Letters =

Discover Nano
- Discipline: Nanotechnology
- Language: English
- Edited by: Jiang Wu, Yu-Lun Chueh

Publication details
- Former name: Nanoscale Research Letters
- History: 2006–present
- Publisher: Springer Science+Business Media
- Frequency: Monthly
- Open access: Yes
- License: Creative Commons
- Impact factor: 5.5 (2023)

Standard abbreviations
- ISO 4: Nanoscale Res. Lett.

Indexing
- ISSN: 1556-276X

Links
- Journal homepage

Discover Nano, formerly Nanoscale Research Letters, is a peer-reviewed open access scientific journal covering research in all areas of nanotechnology and published by Springer Science+Business Media. It is a part of Springer Nature’s Discover Series of journals, which are intended to cover the latest scientific developments in their respective fields.

According to the SCIMAGO journal ranking system over the previous five years (2020–2024), the journal has consistently remained in the first quartile (Q1) in both the fields of condensed matter physics and materials science (miscellaneous). With an Impact Factor of 5.5 in 2023, it was set to receive a new Impact Factor under its new name in 2025.

== Abstracting and Indexing ==
The journal is indexed by the following services and databases:

- DOAJ
- SCIE
- PubMedCentral
- Scopus
