= Joseph ibn Naḥmias =

Jewish scholar of Toledo (f. 14th century)

Joseph Naḥmias (also Joseph ibn Joseph ibn Naḥmias) was a 14th-century Jewish scholar of Toledo, Castile, a student of Asher ben Jehiel. He is best known for an astronomical work in Arabic, Nūr al-ʿĀlam ("The Light of the World") between c. 1330 and 1350, translated into Hebrew by an anonymous scholar later in the 14th century. Naḥmias is also the author of commentaries on the Pentateuch, on Pirkei Avot and on Proverbs.

Joseph b. Abraham ibn Naḥmias was the name of a contemporary of Joseph ben Joseph ibn Naḥmias, who also lived at Toledo, was a colleague of Judah and Jacob ben Asher, and wrote a commentary on Esther in 1326 or 1327.
