= Small Business Innovation Research =

American research grant program

The Small Business Innovation Research (SBIR) program is a U.S. government funding program, coordinated by the Small Business Administration, intended to help certain small businesses conduct research and development (R&D). Funding is provided through contracts or grants. The recipient projects must have commercialization potential and meet specific U.S. government R&D needs.

Funds are obtained by allocating a percentage of the total extramural (R&D) budgets of the 11 federal agencies with extramural research budgets exceeding $100 million. Approximately $2.5 billion is awarded through this program each year. The United States Department of Defense (DoD) is the largest agency in this program with approximately $1 billion in SBIR grants annually. Over half the DoD awards go to firms with fewer than 25 people, and a third to firms with fewer than 10. A fifth are minority or women-owned businesses. Historically, a quarter of the companies receiving grants are receiving them for the first time.

In April 2021, the DoD reported on a lack of due diligence for SBIR recipients, which permitted funds to go toward companies linked to the People's Liberation Army. In 2022, Congress reauthorized the program with additional disclosure requirements for companies that have ties to "any foreign country of concern, including the People's Republic of China."

== Participating agencies ==
Each Federal agency with an extramural budget for R&D in excess of $100,000,000 must participate in the SBIR Program and reserve at least 3.2% of such budget in fiscal year 2017 and each fiscal year after. A Federal agency may exceed these minimum percentages. In 2010, the SBIR program across 11 federal agencies provided over $2 Billion in grants and contracts to small U.S. businesses for research in innovation leading to commercialization.

As of February 2018, SBIR programs are in place at the following agencies:

- Department of Agriculture (National Institute of Food and Agriculture)
- Department of Commerce
  - National Institute of Standards and Technology
  - National Oceanic and Atmospheric Administration
- Department of Defense (divided into 13 components)
  - Department of the Army
  - Department of the Navy
  - Department of the Air Force
  - Chemical and Biological Defense
  - Defense Advanced Research Projects Agency
  - Defense Health Agency
  - Defense Logistics Agency
  - Defense Microelectronics Activity
  - Defense Threat Reduction Agency
  - Missile Defense Agency
  - National Geospatial-Intelligence Agency
  - Office of the Secretary of Defense
  - Special Operations Command
- Department of Education (Institute of Education Sciences)
- Department of Energy
- Department of Health and Human Services (National Institutes of Health, Centers for Disease Control and Prevention, Food and Drug Administration)
- Department of Homeland Security (Science and Technology Directorate, Domestic Nuclear Detection Office)
- Department of Transportation
- Environmental Protection Agency
- National Aeronautics and Space Administration
- National Science Foundation

== Related programs ==
A similar program, the Small Business Technology Transfer Program (STTR), uses a similar approach to the SBIR program to expand public/private sector partnerships between small businesses and nonprofit U.S. research institutions. The main difference between the SBIR and STTR programs is that the STTR program requires the company to partner with a research institution, which must be awarded at least 30% of the total grant funds. As of 2014 federal agencies with external R&D budgets over $1 billion were required to fund STTR programs using an annual set-aside of 0.40%.

The Small Business Technology Council, a member council of the National Small Business Association, hands out the Tibbetts Award annually "to small firms, projects, organizations and individuals judged to exemplify the very best in SBIR achievement."

Federal and State (FAST) is a program of State-based business mentoring and assistance to aid small businesses in preparing SBIR proposals and managing contracts.

== History ==
Congress established the program with the enactment of the Small Business Innovation Development Act in 1982, which authorized federal research grants to small businesses. The SBIR program has four original objectives: to stimulate technological innovation; to use small business to meet Federal research and development needs; to foster and encourage participation by minority and disadvantaged persons in technological innovation; and to increase private sector commercialization innovations derived from Federal research and development.

The program must be periodically reauthorized by the United States Congress, but Congress generally reauthorizes it each year in the budget. The program was re-authorized through FY2017 by the 2012 Defense Authorization Act (P.L.112-81).

Rep. Kim Young (R-CA) and Angie Craig (D-MN) introduced the SCORE for Small Business Act of 2022 to reauthorize the SBIR program as HR 447 of the 117th Congress, which reauthorizes $13.5 million for the program for two years, ensures the SBA prevents abuse and misuse of funds, and expands counseling and training programs to provide online webinars, electronic mentoring platforms, and online toolkits to serve small businesses better.

Historical minimum percentages of their "extramural" R&D budgets for awards to small business concerns are:

- 2.5% of such budget in each of fiscal years 1997 through 2011;
- 2.6% of such budget in fiscal year 2012;
- 2.7% of such budget in fiscal year 2013;
- 2.8% of such budget in fiscal year 2014;
- 2.9% of such budget in fiscal year 2015;
- 3.0% of such budget in fiscal year 2016; and
- 3.2% of such budget in fiscal year 2017 and each fiscal year after.

A Federal agency may exceed these minimum percentages.

== America's Seed Fund ==
The Small Business Innovation Research (SBIR) and Small Business Technology Transfer (STTR), collectively known as the Small Business Programs in the United States, are also known by their brand name, America's Seed Fund. The term "America's Seed Fund" has been adopted by the SBA and NSF, among others, as a unifying brand to promote these opportunities to entrepreneurs and innovators.

== Evaluation ==
The SBIR program has been extensively evaluated, with studies generally divided into two types: descriptive (and survey-based) evaluations and causal analyses.

Descriptive evaluations have relied on surveys of participants, case studies, and administrative data. Large-scale reviews by the National Academies at agencies such as the Department of Defense and the Department of Energy have documented outcomes in terms of commercialization, follow-on funding, and agency mission support, generally finding that SBIR stimulates innovative activity that might not otherwise have occurred. A recent development is the use of web-based approaches to measure commercialization by tracking online evidence of SBIR-funded inventions entering the market, providing a scalable alternative to traditional surveys. Applied to Department of Defense SBIR patents, this method identified commercialization signals for about one in five projects.

Causal evaluations have used quasi-experimental designs to estimate the program's impact. One prominent study of the Department of Energy SBIR program examined funding cutoffs in application rankings and found that early-stage awards increased venture capital financing, patenting, revenue, and firm survival, while later-stage awards had weaker effects.

Together, this body of research shows that SBIR funding contributes to firm innovation and commercialization, though outcomes vary across agencies and project stages.

== See also ==
- Stevenson–Wydler Technology Innovation Act of 1980
- Bayh–Dole Act
