= George E. Kimball =

American professor of quantum chemistry

- Born: July 12, 1906; Chicago, Illinois, U.S.
- Died: December 6, 1967 (aged 61); Pittsburgh, Pennsylvania, U.S.
- Education: Princeton University
- Spouse: Alice Thurston Hunter (m. 1936)
- Children: 4
- Scientific career
- Fields: quantum chemistry

George Elbert Kimball (July 12, 1906 – December 6, 1967) was an American professor of quantum chemistry, and a pioneer of operations research algorithms during World War II.

== Early life ==
George E. Kimball was born to Arthur G. Kimball in Chicago in 1906 and he grew up in New Britain, Connecticut. He was the oldest of three children in a middle-class family; his younger brother, Penn Kimball, also became a professor at Columbia, in journalism. His interest in chemistry was due to his high school chemistry teacher. He attended New Britain High School and graduated in 1923. He spent a year at Phillips Exeter Academy and in 1924 he enrolled at Princeton University. Apparently his father was of the opinion that there were already too many graduates of Yale University in Connecticut. Kimball later claimed that he chose the chemistry program at Princeton because it allowed him to study not only chemistry, but also an equal amount of physics and mathematics, which were also of interest to him. Kimball received his bachelor's degree in 1928, and at that time his main interest was quantum chemistry, which at that time was a field that was still in its infancy, following significant theoretical breakthroughs in quantum mechanics in 1925.

He returned to Princeton's chemistry department to be a graduate student on a graduate fellowship and worked under Hugh Taylor. Kimball's doctoral thesis was on quantum mechanics of the recombination of hydrogen atoms, and he received his Ph.D. in 1932.

== Personal life ==
George E. Kimball married chemist Alice Thurston Hunter, whom he met at MIT, on June 22, 1936. Together, they had four children.

== Work ==
=== Early work (1932–1942) ===
After having missed out on a National Research Fellowship in physics in 1932, he stayed at Princeton as instructor. In 1933, he was awarded a National Research Fellowship in chemistry and went to Massachusetts Institute of Technology (MIT) for two years (1933–1935). While a fellow in MIT's chemistry department, he spent much of his time working in the physics department where his collaborators included the trio John C. Slater, Philip M. Morse (who had been a graduate student at Princeton simultaneously with Kimball, but in physics) and Julius Stratton.

During the summer of 1935, Kimball returned to Princeton, to work with Henry Eyring. After a year when Kimball taught physics at Hunter College, he became assistant professor at the Chemistry Department of Columbia University. One of his students during his early time at Columbia was Isaac Asimov, who remembered getting a zero from him in physical chemistry. During the years 1936–1941, Kimball published nine papers on reaction rates and electrochemical surface effects. He also developed and taught courses in quantum chemistry, and supervised graduate student research. In 1941 he was elected a Fellow of the American Physical Society. The book Quantum Chemistry written by Kimball, Henry Eyring and John Walter, was begun around 1934 and published in 1944. Although periodically occupied with other tasks from 1942, he became a full professor of chemistry at Columbia in 1947 and remained there until 1956.

=== World War II work (1942–1945) ===
In 1942, after the US had entered World War II and was faced with the problem of Nazi German U-boat attacks on transatlantic shipping, Philip M. Morse was tasked with organizing a scientific group in the US Navy to analyze anti-submarine warfare tactics. Kimball was one of the first persons recruited by Morse, and within the year he became Morse's Deputy Director. During the war, the group was called the Operations Research Group (ORG), and was later known as the Operations Evaluation Group, US Navy, and had grown to number some seventy analysts when the war ended in 1945. The ORG's work has become known as the pioneering application of OR in the US, after OR originated in the United Kingdom a few years earlier through pioneering efforts by Patrick Blackett and other scientists. During the war, there was liaison between US and UK analysts in service of RAF Coastal Command.

The ORG's work also extended into the South Atlantic and into the Pacific Ocean theater of World War II, where the US Navy was carrying out a submarine offensive against Japan's supply lines and where defenses against Kamikaze attacks was high on the agenda. At the end of the war some of the ORG members stayed on to document the lessons of the Group's work. Morse and Kimball wrote Methods of Operations Research, which was initially a classified report, but which was later released for general publication and published by MIT Press in 1951, and this book received a lot of attention. Kimball received the Presidential Citation of Merit for his work during World War II, and in 1954 he was elected to the National Academy of Sciences.

=== Post-war work(1945–1967) ===
After World War II and Methods of Operations Research, Kimball returned to Columbia and resumed his research and teaching in theoretical chemistry. He did however continue to be involved in OR activities, including civilian OR applications in industry and the public sector. He continued as a consultant to the Operations Evaluation Group, and when OR expanded into other services and countries he participated in the Weapons Systems Evaluation Group (WSEG), formed in 1949 to carry out OR work for the Joint Chiefs of Staff and the United States Secretary of Defense, as well in the organizing of the NATO Advisory Panel on Operations Research. He participated in the founding of the Operations Research Society of America (ORSA) in 1952 and was a member of ORSA's first council. He was elected ORSA's president in 1964.

In the 1950s, Kimball started to work part-time for the management consulting firm Arthur D. Little and its OR division. In 1956, he left his professorship at Columbia and became a full-time employee of Arthur D. Little, initially as Science Advisor and from 1961 as Vice President.

Kimball was a Unitarian Universalist and he did service as trustee and president of the Unitarian congregation in Hackensack, New Jersey.

=== George E. Kimball Medal ===
Following the death of George E. Kimball, ORSA instituted a medal in his honor, which is awarded annually. It was first awarded in 1974, when Thomas Caywood, Philip M. Morse and George Shortley were awarded.

After ORSA merged with The Institute for Management Science (TIMS) to form the Institute for Operations Research and the Management Sciences (INFORMS), the George E. Kimball Medal has been awarded by INFORMS.

== Death ==
During his last years, Kimball suffered from cardiac illness which became more severe, and he died on December 6, 1967, while in Pittsburgh, Pennsylvania, on business.
