= Omega Rho =

American honor society for management

- ΩΡ
- Founded: April 1, 1976; 50 years ago Philadelphia, Pennsylvania, US
- Type: Honor
- Affiliation: ACHS; INFORMS
- Status: Active
- Emphasis: Operations research and management science
- Scope: North America
- Motto: Ad Optimum per OMEGA RHO^{®}
- Colors: Blue and Red
- Symbol: Saddle projection and tapered arrow
- Chapters: 38
- Members: 181 active 8,069+ lifetime
- Headquarters: 5521 Research Park Drive, Suite 200; Catonsville, Maryland 21228; United States
- Website: connect.informs.org/omegarho/home

Omega Rho (ΩΡ) is a North American scholastic honor society for students in the fields of operations research and management science. It was established in 1976 and became part of the Institute for Operations Research and the Management Sciences (INFORMS) in 1998. Omega Rho has chapters in the United States and Mexico.

== History ==
Omega Rho was founded at the Institute of Management Sciences and Operations Research Society of America (TIMS/ORSA) joint national meeting in Philadelphia, Pennsylvania on April 1, 1976. It is an honor society to recognize students in the fields of operations research and management science and to support study in those areas. Its first president was Clinton K. Ancker Jr. from the University of Southern California.

It was admitted to the Association of College Honor Societies in 1983 with full membership in 1986. It became part of the Institute for Operations Research and the Management Sciences (INFORMS) in 1998.

In 2012, Omega Rho had an active membership of 181 and a total membership of 8,069 As of 2024, it has 38 active chapters in the United States and Mexico. Its headquarters is in Catonsville, Maryland.

== Symbols ==
The colors of Omega Rho are blue and red. The symbols of the Society are explained in its Bylaws as being a saddle projection (~3D model) superimposed by a tapered, red arrow. Its motto is Ad Optimum per OMEGA RHO^{®}.

== Membership ==
Omega Rho is coeducational. Potential members are juniors, seniors, and graduate students who are must in the top 25 percent of their class, with a 3.5 GPA. Faculty can join as faculty members. Omega Rho also admits honorary members.

== Activities ==
Each fall, the society hosts the Omega Rho Distinguished Lecture at the annual INFORMS Meeting. Presenters of the plenary lecture include Anna Nagurney.

== Chapters ==
Following is a list of Omega Rho chapters.

Charter date and range	Institution	Location	Status	Ref.
April 1, 1976	Case Western Reserve University	Cleveland, Ohio	Active	
April 1, 1976	Columbia University	New York City, New York	Active	
April 1, 1976	George Washington University	Washington, D.C.	Active	
April 1, 1976	Naval Postgraduate School	Monterey, California	Active	
April 1, 1976	New York University	New York City, New York	Active	
April 1, 1976	North Carolina State University	Raleigh, North Carolina	Active	
April 1, 1976	Southern Methodist University	Dallas, Texas	Active	
April 1, 1976	State University of New York at Buffalo	Buffalo, New York	Active	
April 1, 1976	University of Illinois Chicago	Chicago, Illinois	Inactive	
April 1, 1976	University of Pittsburgh	Pittsburgh, Pennsylvania	Active	
April 1, 1976	University of Southern California	Los Angeles, California	Active	
October 12, 1981	University of Virginia	Charlottesville, Virginia	Active	
November 3, 1981	Purdue University	West Lafayette, Indiana	Active	
October 25, 1982	United States Naval Academy	Annapolis, Maryland	Active	
April 25, 1983	California Polytechnic State University, San Luis Obispo	San Luis Obispo, California	Active	
April 25, 1983	California State University, Fullerton	Fullerton, California	Active	
May 14, 1984	Air Force Institute of Technology	Dayton, Ohio	Active	
November 26, 1984	Babson College	Wellesley, Massachusetts	Active	
October 27, 1986	George Mason University	Fairfax, Virginia	Active	
October 27, 1986	Saint Louis University	St. Louis, Missouri	Active	
October 27, 1986	University of Texas at Austin	Austin, Texas	Active	
April 27, 1987	University of Cincinnati	Cincinnati, Ohio	Active	
May 1, 1991	University of Massachusetts Amherst	Amherst, Massachusetts	Active	
April 24, 1995	Cornell University	Ithaca, New York	Active	
April 24, 1995	Portland State University	Portland, Oregon	Active	
December 4, 1995	United States Air Force Academy	El Paso County, Colorado	Active	
January 2, 1996	Instituto Tecnológico Autónomo de México	San Ángel, Mexico City, Mexico	Active	
November 4, 1996	University of North Carolina at Chapel Hill	Chapel Hill, North Carolina	Active	
February 9, 2017	Carnegie Mellon University	Pittsburgh, Pennsylvania	Active	
April 12, 2018	Georgetown University	Washington, D.C.	Active	
January 1, 2022	Bucknell University	Lewisburg, Pennsylvania	Active	
2002	Arizona State University	Tempe, Arizona	Active	
August 21, 2003	Florida International University	University Park, Florida	Active	
September 28, 2005	Louisiana State University	Baton Rouge, Louisiana	Active	
2005	United States Military Academy	West Point, New York	Active	
September 27, 2010	University of South Florida	Tampa, Florida	Active	
July 28, 2012	Saint Joseph's University	Philadelphia, Pennsylvania	Active	
February 9, 2015	University of Scranton	Scranton, Pennsylvania	Active	
November 20, 2019	University of Texas at Dallas	Richardson, Texas	Active	
xxxx ?–20xx ?	Clemson University	Clemson, South Carolina	Inactive	
xxxx ?–20xx ?	Miami University	Oxford, Ohio	Inactive	
xxxx ?–20xx ?	Northwestern University	Evanston, Illinois	Inactive	
xxxx ?–20xx ?	Oregon State University	Corvallis, Oregon	Inactive	
xxxx ?–before July 2011	Polytechnic Institute of New York University	Brooklyn, New York	Inactive	
xxxx ?–before July 2011	University of Delaware	Newark, Delaware	Inactive	
xxxx ?–20xx ?	University of Maryland, College Park	College Park, Maryland	Inactive	
xxxx ?–before July 2011	University of New Haven	West Haven, Connecticut	Inactive	
xxxx ?–20xx ?	University of Texas at Arlington	Arlington, Texas	Inactive	

== Notable members ==
=== Collegiate and faculty members ===
Name	Chapter	Notability	Ref.
Steven Nahmias		Professor of operations management at Santa Clara University	

=== Honorary members ===
Following are some of Omega Rho's honorary members.

Name	Initiation date	Notability	Ref.
Russell L. Ackoff	1992	Organizational theorist, consultant, and management scientist	
Robert Bixby	2007	Professor emeritus of computational and applied mathematics at Rice University	
Alfred Blumstein	1988	Professor at the Heinz College and Department of Engineering and Public Policy at Carnegie Mellon University	
Seth Bonder	2004	Engineer who made substantial contributions to operations research for the US military	
Jonathan Caulkins	2014	Drug policy researcher and professor at Heinz College at Carnegie Mellon University	
Abraham Charnes	1987	Mathematician	
Erhan Çınlar	2003	Probabilist and professor meeritus at Princeton University	
David S. C. Chu	1996	US Under Secretary of Defense for Personnel and Readiness and US Assistant Secretary of Defense for Program Analysis & Evaluation	
William W. Cooper	1997	Founding president of The Institute of Management Sciences	
Richard Cyert	1985	Economist, statistician, organizational theorist, and President of Carnegie Mellon University	
George Dantzig	1992	Mathematical scientist known for his development of the simplex algorithm	
Ralph E. Gomory	1989	Applied mathematician and IBM researcher and executive	
Stuart L. Hart	2005	Academic, writer, and theorist	
Karla Hoffman	2013	Professor of systems engineering in the Volgenau School of Engineering of George Mason University	
Ronald A. Howard	1999	Emeritus professor in the School of Engineering at Stanford University	
Edward H. Kaplan	2000	Professor at the Yale School of Management, Yale School of Medicine, and Yale School of Engineering and Applied Science	
Richard M. Karp	1998	Computer scientist and computational theorist at the University of California, Berkeley	
George Kozmetsky	1984	Technology innovator who co-founded Teledyne Inc.	
Gilbert Laporte	2009	Professor of operations research at Université de Montréal	
Richard Larson	1998	Engineer and operations research specialist known for urban service systems and disaster planning	
Judith Liebman	2003	Operations researcher, civil engineer, mechanical engineer, and professor emerita at the University of Illinois at Urbana–Champaign	
John Little	1997	Institute Professor at the Massachusetts Institute of Technology	
Robert E. Machol	1989	Professor of systems at the Kellogg Graduate School of Management of Northwestern University	
Thomas L. Magnanti	2001	Institute Professor and former Dean of the School of Engineering at the Massachusetts Institute of Technology	
William L. Maxwell		Professor of industrial engineering at Cornell University	
Thomas J. Murrin	1983	United States Deputy Secretary of Commerce	
George Nemhauser	1987	Professor of industrial and systems engineering at Georgia Tech	
N. U. Prabhu	1992	Mathematician, known for his contributions to queueing theory	
Alan Pritsker	1982	Engineer and one of the founders of the field of computer simulation	
William R. Pulleyblank	2001	Professor of operations research at the United States Military Academy	
James G. Roche	2002	20th Secretary of the Air Force and executive with Northrop Grumman	
Herbert A. Simon	1986	Nobel Memorial Prize in Economic Sciences	
Robert M. Thrall	1985	Mathematician and a pioneer of operations research	
John A. White	1990	Chancellor of the University of Arkansas and dean Georgia Tech's College of Engineering	

== See also ==
- Honor cords
- INFORMS Journal on Applied Analytics
