= List of members of the National Academy of Engineering (manufacturing, services and human systems) =

This list is a subsection of the List of members of the National Academy of Engineering, which includes members and international members of the United States National Academy of Engineering, living and deceased, each affiliated with one of the academy's disciplinary sections. Members are listed under their primary section, and each entry gives the person's name, primary institution, and election year. For deceased members, the year of death is noted.

== Manufacturing, Services, and Human Systems ==
Name	Institution	Year elected
Egil Abrahamsen (died 2023)	Det Norske Veritas Certification, Inc.	1978
Rodney C. Adkins	Avnet, Inc.	2005
Paul A. Allaire (died 2019)	Xerox Corporation	1996
Dell K. Allen	Brigham Young University	1984
Russell John Allgor	Auger.com	2021
Yusuf Altintas	University of British Columbia	2022
Philip M. Arnold (died 1994)	Phillips Petroleum Company	1970
Egon Balas (died 2019)	Carnegie Mellon University	2006
Cynthia Barnhart	Massachusetts Institute of Technology	2010
Jordan J. Baruch (died 2011)	Jordan Baruch Associates	1974
Leslie A. Benmark	E.I. du Pont de Nemours & Company	1993
Daniel Berg	University of Miami	1976
Dimitris J. Bertsimas	Massachusetts Institute of Technology	2005
John A. Betti (died 2025)	U.S. Department of Defense	1989
Stephan Biller	Purdue University	2020
John R. Birge	The University of Chicago	2011
Robert E. Bixby	Gurobi Optimization, Inc.	1997
Jack L. Blumenthal	Mayfield Senior High School	1997
Alfred Blumstein (died 2026)	Carnegie Mellon University	1998
John G. Bollinger (died 2022)	University of Wisconsin-Madison	1983
Seth Bonder (died 2011)	The Bonder Group	2000
Geoffrey Boothroyd (died 2024)	Boothroyd Dewhurst, Inc.	1989
Francis W. Boulger (died 2010)	Battelle Memorial Institute	1978
H. Kent Bowen (died 2025)	Harvard University	1986
Andrew Brown Jr.	Diamond Consulting	2002
Gerald G. Brown	U.S. Naval Postgraduate School	2008
Donald C. Burnham (died 2005)	Westinghouse Electric Corporation	1968
Lawrence D. Burns	and, et al LLC	2011
Edward J. Campbell (died 2010)	J.I. Case Company	1991
Jian Cao	Northwestern University - Evanston	2022
Pascale Carayon	University of Wisconsin-Madison	2024
Kenneth E. Case (died 2024)	Oklahoma State University	1990
Jonathan P. Caulkins	Carnegie Mellon University, Heinz College	2015
Sebastian Ceria	Fundar	2021
Don B. Chaffin	University of Michigan	1994
Robert A. Charpie (died 2011)	Ampersand Ventures	1975
Josephine Cheng	Independent Consultant	2006
W. Peter Cherry	No Affiliation	2006
Harold Chestnut (died 2001)	GE Corporate Research and Development	1974
Dianne Chong	Boeing Research and Technology	2017
Robert P. Clagett (died 2018)	University of Rhode Island	1986
Norma B. Clayton	The Boeing Company	2022
Robert C. Cohen	Stryker Corporation	2025
Victoria Coleman	University of California, Berkeley	2025
W. Dale Compton (died 2017)	Purdue University	1981
Richard W. Conway (died 2024)	Cornell University	1992
Harry E. Cook (died 2019)	University of Illinois Urbana-Champaign	1990
Thomas M. Cook	Decision Analytics International	1995
Timothy Donald Cook	Apple	2026
William John Cook	University of Waterloo	2011
Gerard Cornuejols	Carnegie Mellon University	2016
Andrew F. Corry (died 1994)	Corry Associates	1978
Gary L. Cowger (died 2023)	GLC Ventures, LLC	2006
Louis Anthony Cox Jr.	Cox Associates, LLC	2012
L. Stanley Crane (died 2003)	Consolidated Rail Corporation	1978
Ralph E. Cross (died 2003)	Cross & Trecker Corporation	1968
James Q. Crowe (died 2023)	J.Q. Crowe Company	2005
Carlos F. Daganzo	University of California, Berkeley	2014
George B. Dantzig (died 2005)	Stanford University	1985
Mark Stephen Daskin	University of Michigan	2017
Lee L. Davenport (died 2011)	GTE Corporation	1973
Earnest W. Deavenport Jr.	Eastman Chemical Company	1997
W. Edwards Deming (died 1993)	Independent Consultant	1983
Richard E. DeVor (died 2011)	University of Illinois Urbana-Champaign	2000
Brenda Jorgensen Dietrich	Cornell University	2014
Ralph L. Disney (died 2014)	No Affiliation	1997
David A. Dornfeld (died 2016)	University of California, Berkeley	2013
Michael T. Duke	Wal-Mart Stores, Inc.	2010
Joseph F. Engelberger (died 2015)	HelpMate Robotics Inc.	1984
Michael L. Eskew	UPS	2004
Elliott M. Estes (died 1988)	General Motors Corporation	1976
Armand V. Feigenbaum (died 2014)	General Systems Company, Inc.	1992
Robert E. Fenton (died 2020)	The Ohio State University	2003
Michael Ference Jr. (died 1996)	Ford Motor Company	1971
Michael Field (died 2007)	Metcut Research Associates Inc.	1976
Marshall L. Fisher	University of Pennsylvania	1994
John S. Foster Jr. (died 2025)	Northrop Grumman Aerospace Systems	1969
Donald N. Frey (died 2010)	Northwestern University - Evanston	1967
Frederick W. Garry (died 1993)	General Electric Company	1982
Donald P. Gaver Jr. (died 2018)	U.S. Naval Postgraduate School	2009
Arthur M. Geoffrion	University of California, Los Angeles	1998
William Wallace George	Harvard Business School	2012
Louis V. Gerstner Jr. (died 2025)	International Business Machines Corporation	1999
Peter W. Glynn	Stanford University	2012
Ken Yigael Goldberg	University of California, Berkeley	2026
Donald Goldfarb	Columbia University	2023
Alan J. Goldman (died 2010)	Johns Hopkins University	1989
Ronald E. Goldsberry	Deloitte	1993
William A. J. Golomski (died 2002)	W.A. Golomski & Associates	1996
Stephen C. Graves	Massachusetts Institute of Technology	2018
Martin Groetschel	Technical University of Berlin	1999
Oleg Yurievich Gusikhin	Ford Motor Company	2026
David H. Gustafson (died 2026)	University of Wisconsin-Madison	2013
J. Michael Harrison	Stanford University	2008
Robert Herman (died 1997)	The University of Texas at Austin	1978
George J. Hess (died 2026)	The Ingersoll Milling Machine Company	1994
James Hillier (died 2007)	RCA Corporation	1967
Keith William Hipel	University of Waterloo	2016
Thom J. Hodgson	North Carolina State University	2001
William Walter Hogan	Harvard University	2021
Kerrie L. Holley	Google Cloud	2023
Charles O. Holliday Jr.	Royal Dutch Shell	2004
Wallace J. Hopp	University of Michigan	2014
Paul M. Horn	New York University	2007
Ronald A. Howard (died 2024)	Stanford University	1999
S. Jack Hu	University of California, Riverside	2015
Linda Parker Hudson	The Cardea Group	2019
Charles W. Hull	3D Systems Corporation	2025
J. Stuart Hunter	Princeton University	2005
Lee A. Iacocca (died 2019)	Lee Iacocca and Associates	1986
Donald L Iglehart	Stanford University	1999
Basil Louis Joffe	AVEVA Aveva Industrial Software	2016
Clarence L. Johnson (died 1990)	Lockheed Corporation	1965
Ellis L. Johnson (died 2024)	Georgia Institute of Technology	1988
William C. Jordan	General Motors Research and Development	2019
Jerry R. Junkins (died 1996)	Texas Instruments Incorporated	1988
Joseph M. Juran (died 2008)	Juran Institute, Inc.	1988
Edward H. Kaplan	Yale School of Management	2003
Ralph L. Keeney	Duke University	1995
Ann B. Kelleher	Intel	2026
Sallie A. Keller	U.S. Census Bureau	2020
John E. Kelly III	International Business Machines Corporation	2013
Karl G. Kempf	Intel Corporation	2003
Behrokh Khoshnevis	Contour Crafting Corporation	2019
Shiro Kobayashi (died 1995)	University of California, Berkeley	1980
Yoram Koren	University of Michigan	2004
Way Kuo	City University of Hong Kong	2000
Thomas R. Kurfess	Georgia Institute of Technology	2020
Kurt H. Lange (died 2009)	University of Stuttgart	1988
Gilbert Laporte	HEC Montreal	2019
James F. Lardner (died 2012)	Deere & Company	1985
Richard C. Larson	Massachusetts Institute of Technology	1993
J. F. M. Leathers (died 1987)	The Dow Chemical Company	1978
Hau L. Lee	Stanford University	2010
Kenneth Levy	Glen Una Investments	2004
Xiaochun Li	University of California, Los Angeles	2026
Gerald J. Lieberman (died 1999)	Stanford University	1987
Helmut List	AVL List GMBH	2000
John D. C. Little (died 2024)	Massachusetts Institute of Technology	1989
T. Mark Liu	TSMC	2026
Christopher B. Lofgren	Schneider National, Inc.	2009
W. D. MacDonnell (died 1999)	Kelsey-Hayes Company	1968
David M. Maddox (died 2026)	Independent Consultant	2004
Thomas L. Magnanti	Massachusetts Institute of Technology	1991
Stephen Malkin (died 2013)	University of Massachusetts at Amherst	2008
Thomas J. Malone (died 2022)	Milliken & Company	1992
Ajay P. Malshe	Purdue University	2018
Alan S. Manne (died 2005)	Stanford University	1990
William S. Marras	The Ohio State University	2009
William L. Maxwell (died 2026)	Arkieva, Inc.	1998
Dan Maydan	Applied Materials, Inc.	1998
Francis K. McCune (died 2000)	General Electric Company	1966
William J. McCune Jr. (died 2017)	Polaroid Corporation	1979
Ian McLennan (died 1998)	Broken Hill Proprietary Company, Ltd.	1978
Robert C. McMaster (died 1986)	The Ohio State University	1970
Eugene S. Meieran	Intel Corporation	1998
Russell D. Meller	Fortna, Inc.	2020
Roland J. Menassa	Champion Home Builders, Inc.	2022
M. Eugene Merchant (died 2006)	TechSolve	1975
Richard C. Messinger	Cincinnati Milacron, Inc.	1985
Joe H. Mize	Oklahoma State University	1988
Michael C. Mountz	Kiva Systems, Inc.	2021
Michael G. Mullen	MGM Consulting, LLC	2014
Elon Reeve Musk	SpaceX	2022
Gerald Nadler (died 2014)	University of Southern California	1986
George L. Nemhauser	Georgia Institute of Technology	1986
Arkadi S. Nemirovski	Georgia Institute of Technology	2017
Joseph H. Newman (died 2020)	Tishman Research Corporation	1973
Deborah J. Nightingale	University of Central Florida	1993
Jorge Nocedal	Northwestern University - Evanston	2020
Richard P. O'Neill	Advanced Research Projects Agency	2022
Russell R. O'Neill (died 2007)	University of California, Los Angeles	1975
Amedeo R. Odoni	Massachusetts Institute of Technology	2011
Robert M. Oliver	University of California, Berkeley	2006
Shmuel Shimon Oren	University of California, Berkeley	2016
James J. Padilla	Ford Motor Company	2001
Jong-Shi Pang	University of Southern California	2021
Colin James Parris	APTIV PLC	2022
Maynard L. Pennell (died 1994)	The Boeing Company	1968
Mario Veiga Ferraz Pereira	PSR Energy Consulting and Analytics	2021
Jacques Peters (died 2018)	Catholic University of Louvain	1977
William P. Pierskalla	University of California, Los Angeles	2007
Andrés F. Weintraub Pohorille	University of Chile	2012
Stephen M. Pollock (died 2025)	University of Michigan	2002
Brad William Porter	Collaborative Robotics, Inc	2026
A. Alan B. Pritsker (died 2000)	Pritsker Corporation	1985
Robert A. Pritzker (died 2011)	Colson Associates, Inc.	1991
Donald E. Procknow (died 2016)	Lucent Technologies	1988
William Robert Pulleyblank	United States Military Academy	2010
Louis T. Rader (died 2003)	University of Virginia	1970
Howard Raiffa (died 2016)	Harvard University	2005
Jens Rasmussen (died 2018)	Risø National Laboratory	2013
H. Donald Ratliff	Georgia Institute of Technology	1996
Charles Eli Reed (died 2007)	General Electric Company	1969
Martin I. Reiman	Columbia University	2022
Ben R. Rich (died 1995)	Lockheed Corporation	1981
Stephen M. Robinson	University of Wisconsin–Madison	2008
Virginia M. Rometty	IBM Corporation	2015
William B. Rouse	Georgia Institute of Technology	1991
Henry M. Rowan (died 2015)	Inductotherm Group	1998
Barbara Estelle Rusinko	Bechtel Corporation	2018
Thomas L. Saaty (died 2017)	University of Pittsburgh	2005
Emanuel Michael Sachs	1366 Technologies Inc.	2016
Andrew P. Sage (died 2014)	George Mason University	2004
Nikolaos V. Sahinidis	Georgia Institute of Technology	2022
Vinod K. Sahney	Northeastern University	2003
Gavriel Salvendy	University of Central Florida	1990
Clifford M. Samuel	PCMS1 Consulting LLC	2019
John M. Samuels Jr. (died 2025)	Revenue Variable Engineering, LLC	1996
Adalio T. Sanchez	S Group Advisory LLC	2023
Linda S. Sanford	New York Hall of Science	1997
Nadine Barbara Sarter	University of Michigan	2019
Maxine L. Savitz	Honeywell Inc.	1992
John A. Schey (died 2010)	University of Waterloo	1981
Sidney E. Scisson (died 1990)	Fenix & Scisson, Inc.	1977
Laurence C. Seifert	AT&T Corporation	1989
Frank Stan Settles	Garrett Corporation	1991
Alexander Shapiro	Georgia Institute of Technology	2020
Hanif D. Sherali	Virginia Polytechnic Institute and State University	2000
Thomas B. Sheridan	Massachusetts Institute of Technology	1995
Jianjun Shi	Georgia Institute of Technology	2018
David Simchi-Levi	Massachusetts Institute of Technology	2023
John Arol Simpson (died 2011)	National Institute of Standards and Technology	1988
Deepika B. Singh	R&D Investment Holdings, LLC	2022
Alice Elaine Smith	The University of Alabama	2025
Kevin Scott Smith	Oak Ridge National Laboratory	2026
Markwick K. Smith (died 2014)	Independent Consultant	1967
Susan Mary Smyth	General Motors Corporation	2018
J. Edward Snyder Jr. (died 2007)	U.S. Department of the Navy	1979
Gunnar H. Sohlenius (died 2015)	KTH-Royal Institute of Technology	1991
James J. Solberg	Purdue University	1989
Gunter Spur (died 2013)	Production Technology Centre	1981
S.V. Sreenivasan	The University of Texas at Austin	2021
Kay M. Stanney	Design Interactive, Inc.	2019
Anne L. Stevens	SA IT Services	2004
Lawrence D. Stone	Metron, Inc.	1999
John W. Sutherland	Purdue University	2023
Judson S. Swearingen (died 1999)	Independent Consultant	1977
Richard H. Tatlow III (died 1993)	Abbott Merkt International, Inc.	1967
Sridhar Tayur	Carnegie Mellon University	2017
James M. Tien	University of Miami	2001
Dawn M. Tilbury	University of Michigan	2024
Michael Jeremy Todd	Cornell University	2015
Paul E. Torgersen (died 2015)	Virginia Polytechnic Institute and State University	1986
G. Keith Turnbull	Alcoa, Inc.	1993
Howard S. Turner (died 2012)	Turner Construction Company	1973
James E. Turner Jr. (died 2017)	General Dynamics Corporation	1998
Hendrik Van Brussel	KU Leuven	2009
Thomas A. Vanderslice (died 2020)	TAV Associates	1980
Arthur F. Veinott Jr. (died 2012)	Stanford University	1986
Arthur R. von Hippel (died 2003)	Massachusetts Institute of Technology	1977
Kuo K. Wang (died 2022)	Cornell University	1989
Hans-Juergen Warnecke (died 2019)	Fraunhofer Institute for Manufacturing Engineering and Automation (IPA)	1993
Alan R. Washburn	U.S. Naval Postgraduate School	2009
William L. Wearly (died 2010)	Ingersoll-Rand Company	1990
Lawrence M. Wein	Stanford University	2009
John A. White Jr.	University of Arkansas	1987
Ward Whitt	Columbia University	1996
Peter Whittle (died 2021)	University of Cambridge	2016
Dennis F. Wilkie	Ford Motor Company	2000
Edgar S. Woolard Jr. (died 2023)	E.I. du Pont de Nemours & Company	1992
Paul K. Wright	University of California, Berkeley	2007
Stephen J. Wright	University of Wisconsin-Madison	2024
Chien-Fu Jeff Wu	The Chinese University of Hong Kong, Shenzhen	2004
Tien Y. Wu	Advanced Semiconductor Engineering, Inc.	2024
Zhiyong Cedric Xia	Apple Inc.	2024
Ken Q. Xie	Fortinet, Inc.	2013
Jie Xue	Cisco Systems Inc.	2023
David D. Yao	Columbia University	2015
Yuehwern Yih	Purdue University	2025
