= Mario Veiga Ferraz Pereira =

Brazilian scientist and engineer

- Born: 12 March 1953 (age 73); Rio de Janeiro, Brazil
- Education: PUC-Rio; UFRJ
- Occupations: Scientist; Engineer
- Awards: Franz Edelman Award Finalist (1985); Order of Rio Branco (2002); IEEE Fellow (2010); National Order of Scientific Merit (Brazil) (2010); IFORS Distinguished Lecturer (2018); Member of the National Academy of Engineering (2021)
- Scientific career
- Fields: Optimization; Operations research Power systems
- Workplaces: Eletrobras Cepel; PUC-Rio; EPRI; PSR (Founder)
- Doctoral advisor: Nelson Maculan

Mario Veiga Ferraz Pereira (born March 12, 1953) is a Brazilian scientist and engineer known as Mario Veiga in Brazil and Mario Pereira outside Brazil. He founded PSR, a consulting and software development company in the energy sector. He is best known for his work in electrical engineering and operations research. Mario Pereira is also known for developing the Stochastic Dual Dynamic Programming algorithm as a co-author with Leotina M.V.G. Pinto, which used to solve multistage stochastic programming problems, in particular in the context of power system operation and planning.

In 2021, Pereira was elected to the National Academy of Engineering for contributions to methodology and implementation of multistage stochastic optimization in hydroelectric scheduling, energy planning, and policy.

== Early life and education ==
Pereira was born in Rio de Janeiro, Brazil, to Yeda Veiga Ferraz Pereira, the first Brazilian female Astronomer, and Mauro José Ferraz Pereira, both civil and electrical engineers and astronomers at the National Observatory (Brazil). He attended Colégio de São Bento and Colégio Santo Inácio.

Pereira received his B.S. in electrical engineering from the Pontifical Catholic University of Rio de Janeiro in 1975, his M.S. and his Ph.D. in computer and systems engineering from the Federal University of Rio de Janeiro in 1976, and in 1985, under Nelson Maculan Filho.

== Career ==
Mario started his career as a researcher at Eletrobras Cepel, Brazil, in 1975, which he left in 1990. At Cepel, he worked on multiple topics at the intersection of power systems and operation research, including hydrothermal scheduling, reliability, power systems operations, and inflow models. During this period, he had developed the Stochastic Dual Dynamic Programming algorithm with Leotina M.V.G. Pinto, which is used to solve multistage stochastic optimization problems, particularly in hydroelectric scheduling. His algorithm led to software that became the official operation tool in Brazil. It has been used in many other countries, including Canada, Colombia, Mexico, New Zealand, Norway, and the United States.

Between 1983 and 1985, he was a project manager at the Electric Power Research Institute, EPRI, in the United States. At EPRI, Pereira worked with George Dantzig among several other researchers. Moreover, between 1988 and 1990, he was also a professor of electrical engineering at the Pontifical Catholic University of Rio de Janeiro. Between 1989 and 1990, he was vice president of the Brazilian Society of Operations Research.

In 1987, Pereira founded PSR, a consulting and software development company in the energy sector. He was CEO at PSR until December 2018, when he became Chief Innovation Officer (CINO). Pereira has continued his academic work and developed multiple operations research based tools for power systems planning and operation. In 2001, he was an advisor to the presidency during the Brazilian energy crisis. He has consulted for multiple countries, including the United States, Canada, and many South America and Asia countries.

=== Awards and honors ===
- Finalist for the Franz Edelman Award in 1985 from INFORMS for his work: Coordinating the Energy Generation of the Brazilian National Hydrothermal Electrical Generating System.
- Elected to the Brazilian Academy of Sciences in 2001.
- Order of Rio Branco from the President of Brazil in 2002.
- IEEE Fellow class of 2010 for application of multistage stochastic optimization to power system operation and planning.
- Medal of the National Order of Scientific Merit from the President of Brazil in 2010.
- Elected to the Brazilian Academy of Engineering (pt:Academia Nacional de Engenharia) in 2017.
- IFORS Distinguished Lecturer in 2018.
- Elected to the National Academy of Engineering in 2021 for contributions to methodology and implementation of multistage stochastic optimization in hydroelectric scheduling, energy planning, and policy.

=== Publications ===
Selected publications:

- Pereira, Mario VF; Pinto, Leontina MVG (May 1991). "Multistage stochastic optimization applied to energy planning". Mathematical Programming. 52 (1–3): 359–375. doi:10.1007/BF01582895.
- Monticelli, Alcir; Pereira, Mario VF; Granville, Sergio (February 1987). "Security-constrained optimal power flow with post-contingency corrective rescheduling". IEEE Transactions on Power Systems. 2 (1): 175–180. Bibcode:1987ITPSy...2..175M. doi:10.1109/TPWRS.1987.4335095.
- Binato, Silvio; Pereira, Mario; Granville, Sergio (May 2001). "A new Benders decomposition approach to solve power transmission network design problems". IEEE Transactions on Power Systems. 16 (12): 235–240. Bibcode:2001ITPSy..16..235B. doi:10.1109/59.918292.
- Pereira, Mario; Granville, Sergio; Fampa, Marcia; Dix, Rafael; Barroso, Luiz (February 2005). "Strategic bidding under uncertainty: a binary expansion approach". IEEE Transactions on Power Systems. 20 (1): 180–188. Bibcode:2005ITPSy..20..180P. doi:10.1109/TPWRS.2004.840397.
- da Costa, Luiz Carlos; Thomé, Fernanda; Dias Garcia, Joaquim; Pereira, Mario (January 2021). "Reliability-Constrained Power System Expansion Planning: A Stochastic Risk-Averse Optimization Approach". IEEE Transactions on Power Systems. 36 (1): 97–106. arXiv:1910.12972. Bibcode:2021ITPSy..36...97D. doi:10.1109/TPWRS.2020.3007974.

Books:

- Maculan, Nelson; Pereira, Mario (1980). Programação linear. São Paulo, Brazil: Atlas.
- Pardalos, Panos; Rebennack, Steffen; Pereira, Mario; Iliadis, Niko (1 September 2010). Handbook of Power Systems I. Springer Berlin, Heidelberg. doi:10.1007/978-3-642-02493-1. ISBN 978-3-642-02492-4.
- Rebennack, Steffen; Pardalos, Panos; Pereira, Mario; Iliadis, Niko (29 August 2010). Handbook of Power Systems II. Springer Berlin, Heidelberg. doi:10.1007/978-3-642-12686-4. ISBN 978-3-642-12685-7.

Book chapters:

- Pereira, Mario (November 1984). "Chapter 8: Hydroelectric system planning". Expansion planning for electrical generating systems: a guidebook (PDF). International Atomic Energy Agency (IAEA), Vienna. pp. 303–336. ISBN 9201554842.
- Pereira, Mario; Kelman, Jerson; Damázio, J.; Costa, J. (December 1, 1982). "Flood Control Restrictions for Hydroelectric Plants". Decision Making for Hydrosystems: Forecasting and Operation (PDF). International Symposium on Real-Time Operation of Hydrosystems, Water Resources Publications. pp. 303–336. ISBN 0918334500.
