= Franz Edelman Award for Achievement in Operations Research and the Management Sciences =

Annual award

Edelman Award logo

The Franz Edelman Award for Achievement in Operations Research and the Management Sciences recognizes excellence in the execution of operations research on the organizational level.

== About ==
The award is presented annually by the Institute for Operations Research and the Management Sciences (INFORMS).

The international competition pits six teams from industry, government, healthcare, and the non-profit sectors. The competition takes place at the INFORMS Business Analytics Conference and concludes with the announcement of the winner at a gala dinner at the conference. It began in 1971 as the TIMS Prize and was named for Franz Edelman, the operations research director of RCA, shortly after his death in 1982. It carries a cash award of $10,000. Since its inception, nearly $250 billion in benefits have been tabulated among Franz Edelman Award finalist teams. Following the competition, INFORMS publishes papers by the Edelman finalists in the January issue of the INFORMS journal Interfaces.

== List of recent winners ==
- 2024: Molslinjen and Halfspace: Achievement in Advanced Analytics, Operations Research and Management Science, for its use of operations research (O.R.) to enhance data-driven ferry operations.
- 2023: Walmart: Consistent and innovative dedication to utilizing operations research (O.R.) and analytics in its organizational decision-making for demand forecasting, supply chain and merchandising operations.
- 2022: Ministry of Science, Technology, Knowledge and Innovation and Ministry of Health of Chile: Achievement in Advanced Analytics, Operations Research and Management Science for its use of operations research (O.R.) to improve response strategies to the COVID-19 pandemic.
- 2021: United Nations World Food Programme: Towards Zero Hunger with Analytics
- 2020: Intel: Intel Realizes $25 Billion by Applying Advanced Analytics from Product Architecture Design Through Supply Chain Planning
- 2019: Louisville Metropolitan Sewer District (MSD) : Analytics and Optimization Reduce Sewage Overflows to Protect Community Waterways in Kentucky
- 2018: FCC : Unlocking the Beachfront: Using O.R. to Repurpose Wireless Spectrum
- 2017: Holiday Retirement and Prorize : Revenue Management Provides Double-digit Revenue Lift for Holiday Retirement
- 2016: United Parcel Service (UPS): UPS On Road Integrated Optimization and Navigation (Orion) Project
- 2015: Syngenta: Advanced Analytics for Agricultural Product Development
- 2014: U.S. Centers for Disease Control and Prevention (CDC): Polio Eradicators Use Integrated Analytical Models to Make Better Decisions
- 2013: Delta Commissioner of the Netherlands: Economically Efficient Flood Standards to Protect the Netherlands against Flooding
- 2012: TNT Express: Supply Chain-Wide Optimization at TNT Express
- 2011: MISO: Operations Research Ramps Up the Power Market in the Midwest
- 2010: Indeval: application of operations research and analytics to speedily processing complex securities transactions (led by Omar Romero-Hernandez).
- 2009: Hewlett-Packard: HP Transforms Product Portfolio Management with Operations Research
- 2008: Netherlands Railways: The New Dutch Timetable—the OR Revolution
- 2007: Memorial Sloan-Kettering Cancer Center: Operations Research Answers to Cancer Therapeutics
- 2006: Warner Robins Air Logistics Center: Streamlining Aircraft Repair and Overhaul at Warner Robins Air Logistics Center
- 2005: General Motors: General Motors Increases Its Production Throughput
- 2004: Motorola Inc: Reinventing the Supplier Negotiation Process at Motorola
- 2003: Canadian Pacific Railway (First-Place Winner): Perfecting the Scheduled Railroad- Model-Driven Operating Plan Development
- 2002: Continental Airlines: A New Era for Crew Recovery at Continental Airlines
- 2001: Merrill Lynch, Inc: Pricing Analysis for Merrill Lynch Integrated Choice
- 2000: Jeppesen Sanderson, Inc.: Flexible Planning and Technology Management at Jeppesen Sanderson, Inc.

== See also ==
- List of mathematics awards
