= Demanufacturing =

Disassembly of products for recycling

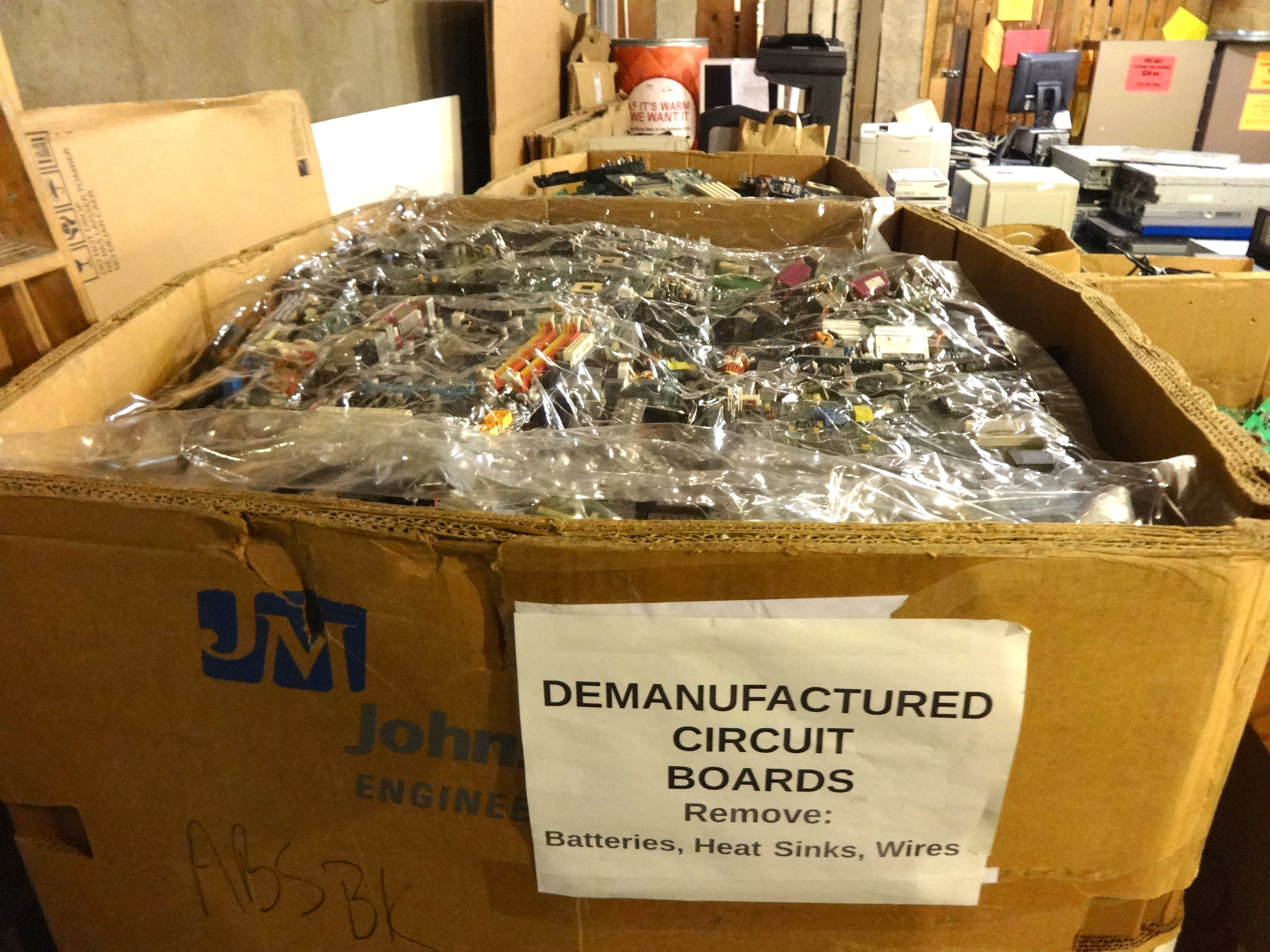
A box of demanufactured circuit boards

Demanufacturing is a process where a product after extensive usage, often at the end of its lifespan, is then disassembled or dismantled into its components. Demanufacturing is also commonly referred to as the reverse process of manufacturing and, hence, can next to disassembly or dismantling also include various other processing steps. For example, demanufacturing commonly starts with product manipulation and next a classification step to evaluate the functionality of the product and/or the herein contained components to assess if these are suitable for reuse or are deemed unusable and need to be recycled, so the materials can be used in new products. Demanufacturing was proposed to be used in all industries as a means reduce the environmental footprint while preserving economic viability of the processes involved. This term was coined by the professors Walter W. Olson and John W. Sutherland in 1993.

In the case of waste electronics demanufacturing involves dismantling them into their components. After a classification and product manipulation step, electronics are typically dismantled into their components either to support the reuse of components (HDDs, RAM, CPUs, etc.) or to facilitate increased precious metal (e.g. Au and Ag of printed wiring boards) and critical metal recovery (e.g. Nd from permanent magnets in HDDs).

== Forms of demanufacturing ==
There are two forms of demanufacturing: destructive and non-destructive. Non-destructive demanufacturing incorporates non-destructive disassembly actions or semi-destructive disassembly actions in which only the fasteners are damaged to allow for components to be taken apart and then reused in new products. In contrast Destructive demanufacturing relies on destructive dismantling techniques in which information on the product structure is used to define optimal cutting points, which are used to take the product apart and to separate specific components with a higher yield and concentration in support of material recycling. Destructive demanufacturing is commonly adopted when component reuse is no longer possible due to component failures or technical obsolesce and when destructive dismantling techniques are more cost efficient.

== Economic effects ==
There are numerous economic effects that come with demanufacturing. The practice provides numerous jobs to people and communities; in addition business opportunities and reduction in environmental impact of component reuse and product remanufacturing is considered to encompass great potential. It has been estimated by the Office of the Federal Environmental Executive that $100 billion in revenue has been generated from this practice.
