= John W. Sutherland =

American academic

- Born: John William Sutherland; Oklahoma City, Oklahoma, US
- Education: University of Illinois Urbana-Champaign
- Scientific career
- Fields: Manufacturing
- Workplaces: Purdue University
- Thesis: A Dynamic Model of the Cutting Force System in the End Milling Process (1987)
- Doctoral advisor: Richard E. DeVor

John William Sutherland is Distinguished Professor and Fehsenfeld Family Head of The School Sustainability Engineering and Environmental Engineering (SEE) at Purdue University who specializes in the application of sustainability principles to design, manufacturing, and other industrial issues.

== Biography ==
John W. Sutherland was born in Oklahoma City, Oklahoma, United States, to Bill and Polly Sutherland. He has a younger brother (Michael) and sister (Nancy). His early years were spent in Arvada, Colorado – the family moved to the Chicago area in 1967. He is a graduate of Hinsdale Central High School (Hinsdale, Illinois). He attended the University of Illinois Urbana-Champaign (UIUC), and received his BS and MS degrees in industrial engineering, and his PhD degree in mechanical engineering in 1980, 1982, and 1987, respectively. As a graduate student, his advisor was Richard E. DeVor.

He married his wife in 1981, they have two daughters.

== Early career ==
Following the completion of his doctoral degree, Sutherland became Vice President of Process Design and Control, Inc., Champaign, IL (1987–91). PDC developed and sold software for Statistical Process Control (SPC) and Statistical Design of Experiments (DOE), delivered short courses to industry on statistical methods for quality and improvement, and provided solutions to manufacturing challenges. While at PDC also Sutherland served as an adjunct faculty member at UIUC delivering courses on SPC and DOE. Prior to assuming his position at Purdue University in 2009, he held the Henes Chair Professorship of Mechanical Engineering and served as the Director of the Sustainable Futures Institute at Michigan Technological University.

== Leadership and Contributions at Michigan Tech University ==
Dr. John W. Sutherland had a impactful tenure at Michigan Technological University, where he held multiple positions from 1991 to 2009. He began as an Assistant Professor in the Department of Mechanical Engineering and progressed through the ranks to become a Full Professor. He served as the Associate Department Chair and Director of Graduate Studies from 1997 to 2001, significantly expanding the graduate program. Dr. Sutherland was appointed the inaugural Richard and Elizabeth Henes Chair Professor of Mechanical Engineering in 2002, a prestigious position that underscored his leadership in environmentally responsible design and manufacturing. Additionally, he was the Co-Director (2003-2007) and Director (2007-2009) of the Sustainable Futures Institute (SFI), an interdisciplinary institute promoting sustainability research and education across the MTU campus. Under his leadership, SFI established new courses, graduate certificates, and several research centers, achieving annual expenditures exceeding $4 million.

== Leadership and Contributions at Purdue University ==
Environmental and Ecological Engineering (EEE) was formed as an independent department within the College of Engineering to serve as a focus for learning, discovery, and engagement with respect to environmental engineering issues. As the first permanent Head, Professor Sutherland has provided a strategic vision for and leadership in all EEE activities including creation of undergraduate and graduate programs and degrees, and nurturing the growth of a robust research enterprise. He oversees all EEE staff and serves as a mentor to all EEE faculty. Sutherland coordinated the development, approval, and implementation of the BS EEE degree program, which was approved by the State of Indiana in fall 2012 and is ABET accredited. He played the same role in establishing the MS and PhD degree programs in EEE, which were approved by the State of Indiana in summer 2015. Beginning with a single faculty member (the Head) in 2009, through internal partnerships and new hires, he has grown the size of the EEE faculty to 18 (2021). He has also guided the EEE strategies for marketing and communications, recognition programs, alumni/friend/company interactions, and development. In terms of development, he has helped secure endowments for a headship, rising star professorship, scholarships, as well as other gifts.

== Affiliations ==
Throughout his career, Dr. Sutherland has been affiliated with various significant projects and organizations that highlight his leadership and collaborative efforts. These include:

- Indiana Next Generation Manufacturing Competitiveness Center (IN-MaC): As Co-Executive Director from 2015 to 2018, Dr. Sutherland provided strategic vision and leadership for this initiative, which focuses on technology transfer, education and workforce development, and research innovation in manufacturing.
- Manufacturing USA Institutes: Through IN-MaC, Dr. Sutherland engaged with several Manufacturing USA Institutes, including the Digital Manufacturing and Design Innovation Institute (DMDII), the Institute for Advanced Composites Manufacturing Innovation (IACMI), and NextFlex, among others.
- Critical Materials Institute (CMI): As a researcher affiliated with CMI, Dr. Sutherland has contributed to optimizing the economic performance of critical material recovery and recycling technologies.
- Sustainable Futures Institute (SFI) at Michigan Tech: Dr. Sutherland was instrumental in establishing and leading this institute, which promoted sustainability across various disciplines.

== Awards ==
Dr. Sutherland is a NAE (National Academy of Engineering) (2023) member and a Fellow of the American Association for the Advancement of Science (AAAS) (2022), the Society of Manufacturing Engineers (SME), American Society of Mechanical Engineers (ASME), and The International Academy for Production Engineering CIRP (2011). Dr. Sutherland's awards and honors include: NAE (National Academy of Engineering) (2023) AEESP Frederick George Pohland Medal (2022) SME Gold Medal (2018) William T. Ennor Manufacturing Technology Award (2013) SAE International John Connor Environmental Award (2011) SME Education Award (2009) Presidential Early Career Award for Scientists and Engineers (1996) SME Outstanding Young Manufacturing Engineer Award (1992)

== Contributions ==
John W. Sutherland is a pioneer in the field of environmental sustainability in manufacturing that seeks to address the root cause of environmental challenges rather than managing the symptoms. Sutherland's research goal is decreasing environmental impacts while enhancing economic competitiveness. In 1993, Professor Sutherland and Professor Walter W. Olson created the term of "Demanufacturing", which was proposed to be used in all industries as a means reduce the environmental footprint while preserving economic viability of the processes involved. His current research areas include smart/sustainable manufacturing, circular materials economy (including recycling and remanufacturing), sustainability of bioenergy systems, green manufacturing planning, sustainability impacts, and social sustainability of manufacturing.

== Contributed Books ==
• Sensory Science Theory and Applications in Foods

• Statistical Quality Design and Control: Contemporary Concepts and Methods

• Handbook of Environmentally Conscious Manufacturing

• Environmentally Conscious Manufacturing

• Renewable Energy From Forest Resources in the United States

• Energy Efficient Manufacturing
