= James Henry Carpenter =

American engineer and industrialist (1846–1898)

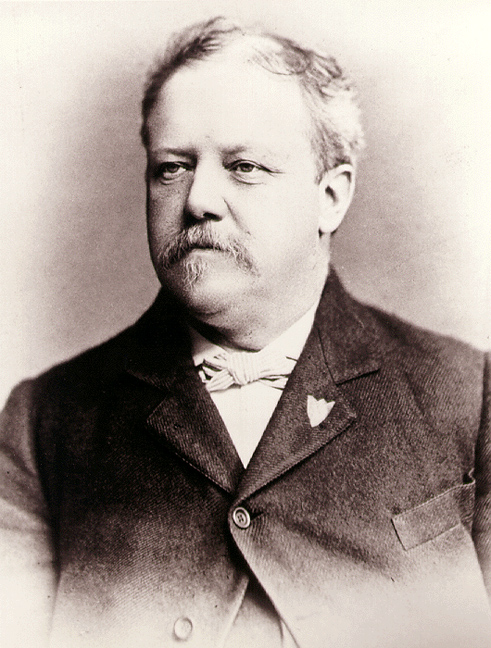
- James Henry Carpenter
- Born: September 14, 1846; Brooklyn, New York, U.S.
- Died: March 6, 1898 (aged 51); Reading, Pennsylvania, U.S.
- Burial place: Charles Evans Cemetery; Reading, Pennsylvania, U.S.
- Military career
- Allegiance: United States
- Branch: Union Navy
- Service years: 1861–1865
- Rank: Master's mate and Midshipman
- Nickname: Henry
- Conflicts: American Civil War
- Other work: Founder of Carpenter Steel Company, renamed in 1968 Carpenter Technology Corporation.

James Henry Carpenter (September 14, 1846 – March 6, 1898) was a 19th-century American engineer and industrialist who founded the Carpenter Steel Company (renamed in 1968 as the Carpenter Technology Corporation). Born in Brooklyn, New York, he joined the Union Navy as a "cabin boy" at age 15 during the American Civil War, during which he was wounded in action. He was promoted to master's mate in the United States Navy for meritorious conduct and was appointed to the United States Naval Academy at age 16. He resigned from the US Navy in 1865, aged 19, and studied engineering in New Jersey.

On June 7, 1889, he founded the Carpenter Steel Company of Reading, Pennsylvania, becoming its general manager. Under his management, the company was a successful supplier of armor plating and ordnance to the US Navy.

== Early life ==
Carpenter was born in New Jersey on September 14, 1846, to William H. Carpenter and Elizabeth Wallace. His father is believed to be a descendant of Rehoboth Carpenter family and of its founder William Carpenter (born about 1605 in England), who migrated to America in 1638 on the Bevis. Carpenter was the first of five children. His youngest brother, Dr. Frank E. Carpenter (born 10 Jul 1858) worked with him in the mid to late 1890s at the Carpenter Steel Company.

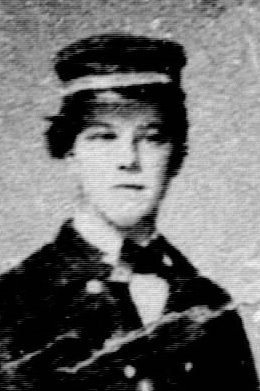
James Henry Carpenter in 1861 or 1862 in the Union Navy.

Carpenter spent time on Long Island as a child, both in Jamaica, Queens, and in Brooklyn. Fascinated by sailing ships and by how things worked, he learned to sail small boats and said he wanted to be a sailor. He went to sea as a cabin boy in 1860, aged 14, with his father's permission.

== Civil War ==
In May 1861, at the start of the American Civil War, the 15-year-old Carpenter enlisted as a "cabin boy" and was assigned to USS Santee, a recently commissioned 44-gun wooden-hulled three-mast frigate under the command of Captain Henry Eagle. Santee arrived in the Gulf of Mexico in July, headed for Galveston, Texas, for Union blockade duty.

Carpenter was present when Santee captured the Confederate States Navy schooner C.P. Knapp off the Florida coast and the CSN brig Delta off Galveston in October. He was selected for a night-time cutting out operation that was intended to capture and burn the Confederate armed steamer General Rusk. After the boats ran aground and it took time to free them, the officer in charge chose a picket boat called the Royal Yacht as an alternate target. They captured it at the cost of two lives, setting fire to it and taking a dozen prisoners. Carpenter was one of the wounded, having been stabbed in the thigh during the hand-to-hand fighting, and was mentioned in dispatches.

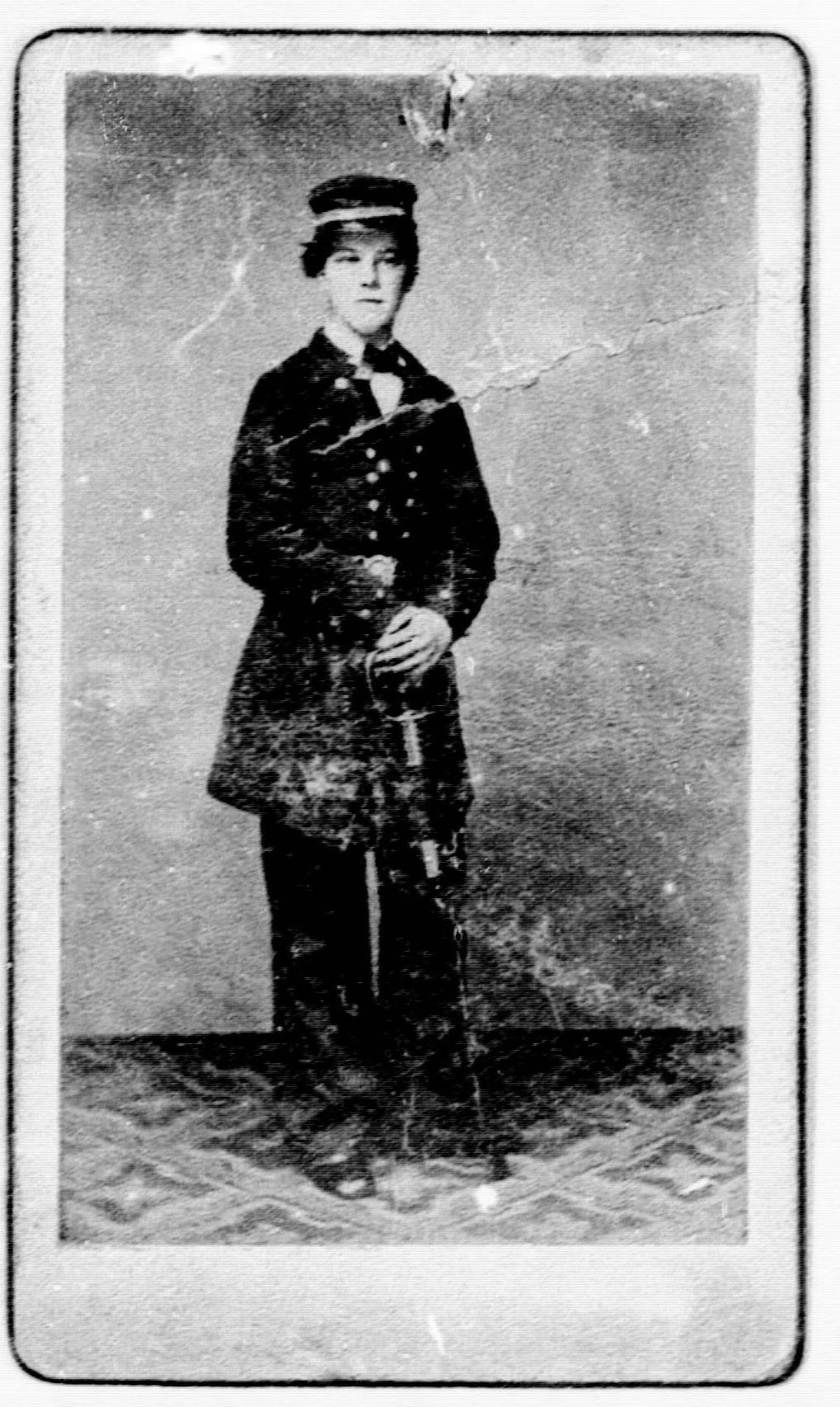
Carpenter in 1861 or 1862 in the Union Navy. Full image from his widow's pension file.

At the end of December 1861, Santee captured the CSN schooner Garonne. Shortly after, Carpenter was made acting master's mate of Santee. (At that time a frigate carried two master's mates, who were often senior and experienced sailors. In today's US Navy, a similar position is held by the senior chief petty officer). On February 11, 1862, Carpenter was appointed a master's mate and ordered to the flagship, USS Niagara. After evaluation he was appointed on February 21, 1862, as master's mate to the steamer USS R. R. Cuyler and took part in the capture of several enemy vessels.

On June 20, 1862, R. R. Cuyler's captain reported that Carpenter's good work "justifies the suggestion that he should endeavor to obtain admission to the U.S. Naval Academy". Carpenter left R. R. Cuyler on September 22, 1862, and was assigned to USS Constitution until he was discharged as a sailor on November 28, 1862. He was appointed midshipman the next day.

The United States Naval Academy (USNA) had been relocated to Fort Adams in Newport, Rhode Island, for the duration of the Civil War. Carpenter started there in December 1862, when he was 16. He lived, worked, and studied on the school ships Constitution and Santee, the latter having recently been decommissioned as a warship and recommissioned as a school ship. During 1863–1865 Carpenter's academic work was generally good and he excelled in the sciences, but later he accumulated many demerits, which brought him restrictions and extra duties.

Carpenter was one of the cadets who sailed on Santee on August 2, 1865, to return to the USNA at Annapolis, Maryland, where the strict pre-war discipline and decorum of spit and polish was re-instituted. It was harsh change for many cadet midshipmen, like Carpenter, who obtained many new demerits. At the end of his third year, he tendered his resignation. His reasons are unclear, but his father was contacted and no serious effort was made to retain Carpenter at the academy. "Letter No. 49, dated 23 Nov 1865" from Rear Admiral David Dixon Porter "regarding the resignation of James Henry Carpenter, age 19, member of the 3rd class" indicates a deterioration in attitude and commitment. Carpenter was honorably discharged from the USNA on December 18, 1865, aged 19.

== Marriages ==
Carpenter attended an engineering college in New Jersey, where he completed his studies. (It may have been Rutgers University, but this has not been confirmed.) While finishing school, he met Theodora Anna Silvera (Siloena), born about September 2, 1846, in New Jersey. Her father Joseph was from Portugal and her mother Anna was born in England. Carpenter married Theodora in West Hoboken, New Jersey, on December 17, 1867. They lived for several years in Paterson, New Jersey, where their daughter Serena (January 12, 1868 – October 30, 1870) and their first son Walter (September 2, 1870 – January 13, 1895) were born. Carpenter became a block engineer and tinkered with metallurgy.

By 1875, they were living in Brooklyn, where their daughter Ruth (c. 1875 – c. 1900/1910) and second son Joseph William (March 13, 1879 – ?) were born. Shortly after 1880 the family moved to Hartford, Connecticut, where Theodora died on February 2, 1883, from complications during childbirth. The baby, a daughter, was raised by Theodora's paternal grandmother. Walter, Ruth and Joseph would later stay with Theodora's parents while Carpenter focused on working.

Carpenter then went to seek engineering work in Chicago, where he met Georgian Clara Smith (born June 1865 in Canada; died August 21, 1930) of Saint Paul, Minnesota. They married on July 16, 1884, in Chicago, and their daughter Georgette was born there on October 8, 1886. They later had two sons, Harry Rudolph (October 5, 1889 – October 2, 1903) and Wesley Folger (November 4, 1892 – ?) in Reading, Berks County, Pennsylvania.

== Carpenter Steel Company ==
In late 1887, Carpenter went to Europe to study steel foundries and the metallurgy of steel. During this time he developed the improved processes that he would later patent. Carpenter returned home at the end of December 1888 looking for financial support to start his business. Working with a small group of New York capitalists, he found that the city council in Reading, Pennsylvania, encouraged his efforts and that Reading would be an "ideal place" to put his ideas to work.

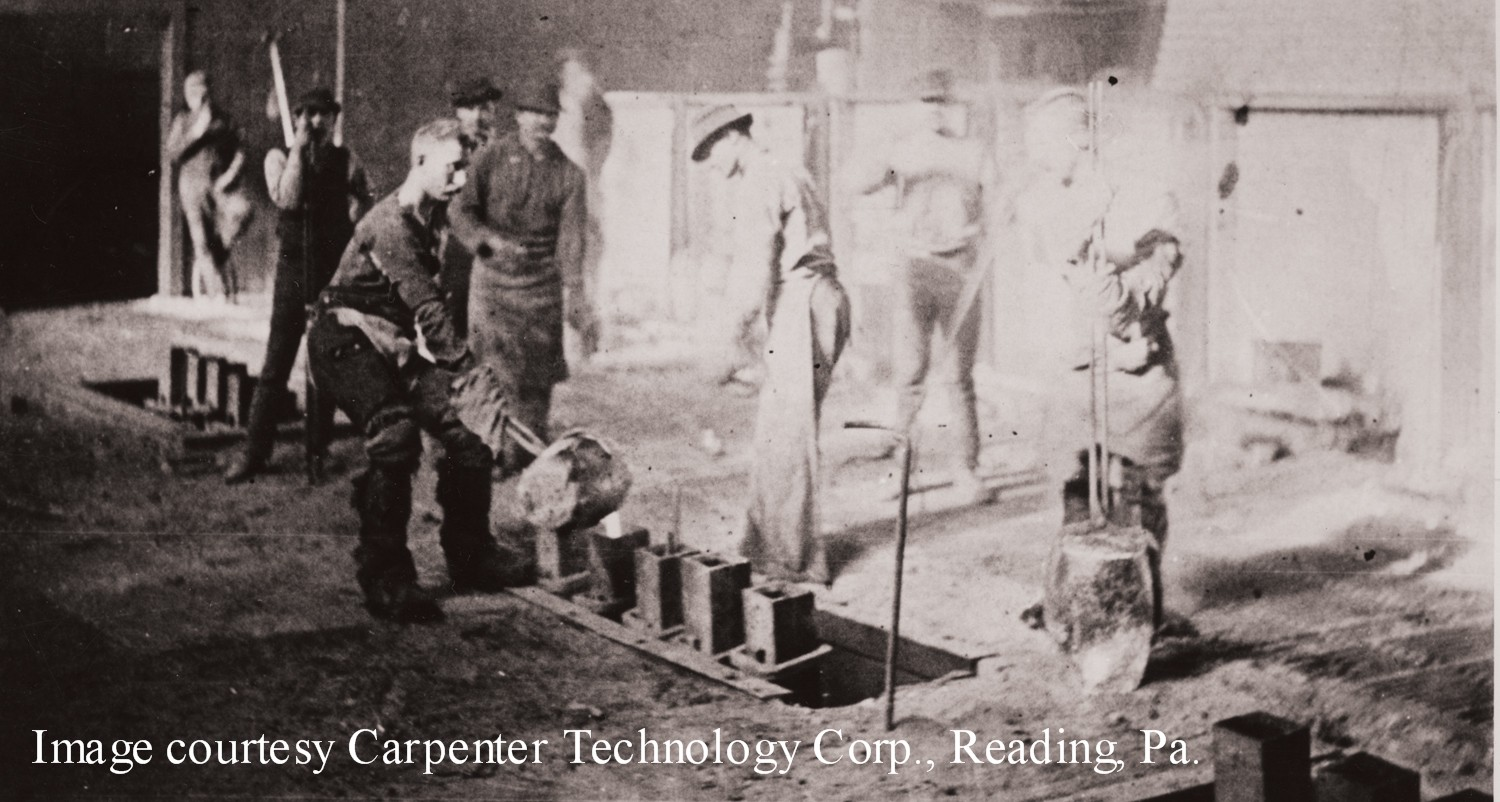
Carpenter Steel Company in the 1890s pouring steel into crucibles.

Carpenter Steel Company, Inc. was incorporated on June 7, 1889, and Carpenter became its general manager. He leased the defunct Philadelphia and Reading rail mill in Reading, and eleven weeks later he was pouring steel for tools. Within a short time, 3,000 tons of steel had been produced and the company was receiving orders that exceeded the capacity of the mill. In November Carpenter acquired the nearby Union Foundry, which he modernized and expanded. The old Union Foundry is now the headquarters of the Carpenter Technology Corporation and is a specialty steel producer.

Rob Engle describes Carpenter's approach as an employer in an essay for the Historical Society of Berks County:

James Carpenter, founder of Carpenter Steel, believed strongly in the safety and welfare of his employees. Photographs of the era depict employees receiving medical care at company sponsored health clinics, clean dormitory rooms provided to workers, employees engaged in spirited games of baseball on a Carpenter Steel-maintained field at lunch time, and happy workers participating in a local parade. Far from being entirely company propaganda, Carpenter Steel's approach to employee relations is supported by the fact that five drives to unionize workers over the years all resulted in a rejection of union affiliation in favor of remaining a non-union shop. The company's policy was to "stay one step ahead of the union benefits and offer Carpenter employees all the advantages of union membership without joining.

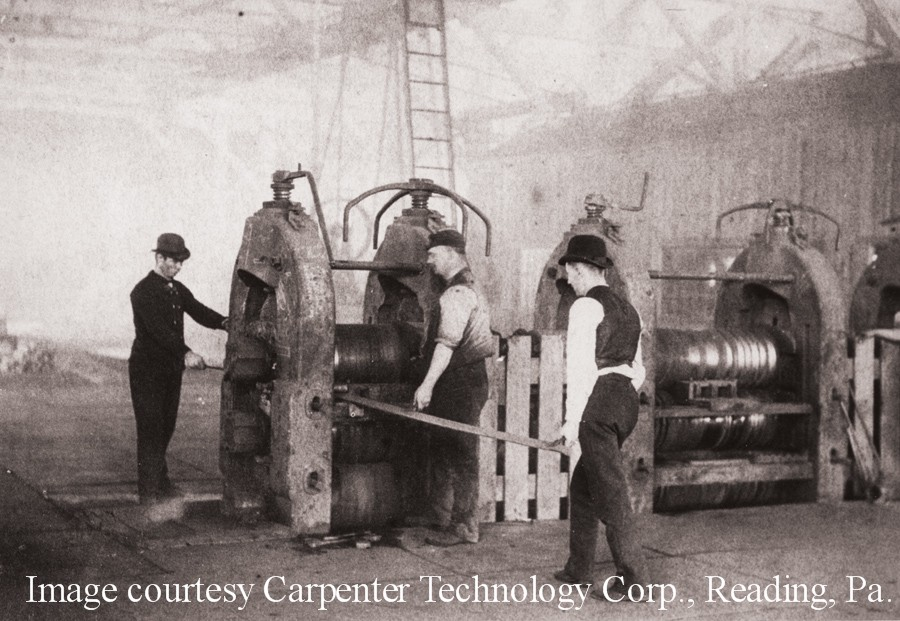
Carpenter Steel Company in the 1890s showing a rolling mill

Carpenter bought property and built an Italianate house at 606, North Fifth Street, Reading, which he called Swanona (not Swannanoa). The house is slightly over a mile south of the Carpenter foundry, and Carpenter often walked to work. He became involved in community affairs as a member of the Grand Army of the Republic and later became a Vice Commander of the Military Order of the Loyal Legion of the United States, also known as the Union Veteran Legion, in Reading. These organizations gained him business contacts and led him to learn that specialty steel was needed by the U.S. Navy.

Benjamin F. Tracy, the Secretary of the Navy from 1889 though 1893 during the administration of US President Benjamin Harrison, had been promoting a "New Navy" to replace the aged vessels of the Civil War era. One requirement was for three new battleships, for which the Navy needed both new, harder steel and projectiles that could pierce such steel. A contract for a critical specialized tool steel was signed in May 1890. In June, Congress passed a commitment to increased funding for the new ships, giving rise to a need for new steel to pierce their armored plates, and in June 1891 a new contract was signed for armor-piercing projectiles of 4–13 inches' diameter.

From 1890, Carpenter used a process for treating steel ingots by air hardening. Application for a patent was delayed at first, because the process was deemed a state secret. Carpenter filed an application on March 14, 1895, with the title "Apparatus for treating Ingots of Steel", but there was a further delay before the patent was finally awarded on July 3, 1900.

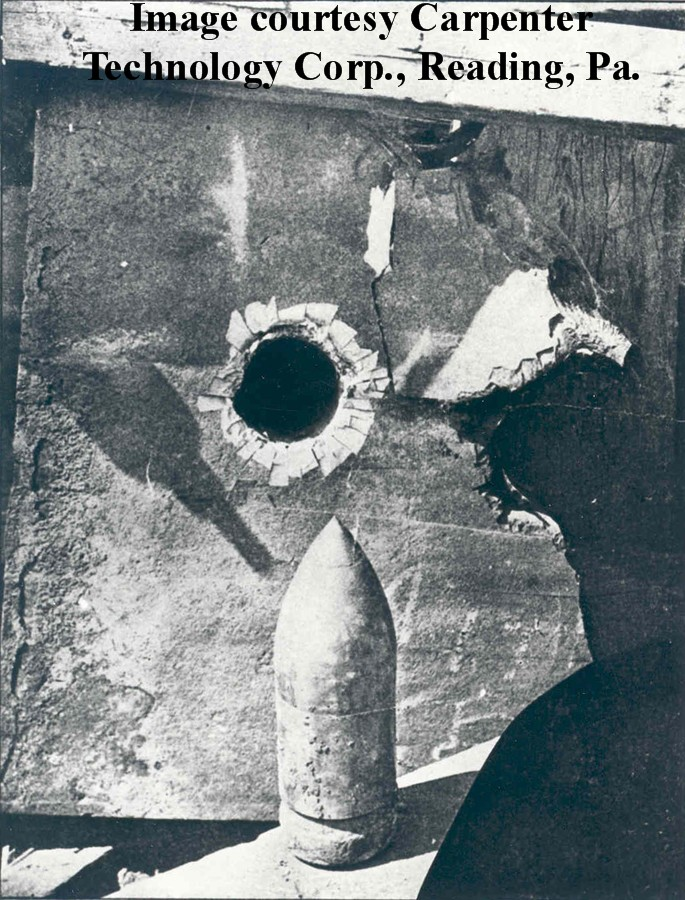
Carpenter Steel Company projectile test on steel plate (early 1890s)

USS Indiana (BB-1), the first modern United States battleship, was commissioned on November 20, 1895, and was considered a test bed for future battleships. This class of ship did not use Carpenter's steel, but Harvey armor, in which only the facing of the steel plates was hardened. The belt armor plates on Indiana were at most eighteen inches thick, and most plates were far less. A standard 13-inch gun used on the USS Indiana was expected to penetrate 10–12 inches of Harvey armor. Testing showed that Carpenter's projectiles fired from the same gun could achieve penetrations of up to 15 inches. In November 1896, the Navy informed Congress that Carpenter's projectiles had tested successfully, calling them "the first made that would pierce improved armor plate".

When USS Maine (ACR-1) exploded in Havana Harbor, Cuba, on February 15, 1898, "Remember the Maine!" became a rallying cry and the pace at Carpenter Steel became frantic as the demand for the new projectiles increased. Carpenter borrowed money against the value of his house to increase production. He was already in debt, but was considered a good credit risk because of the US Navy contracts. But these contracts used Carpenter Steel's entire production capacity, and payments were always late.

Carpenter and the board members of Carpenter Steel Company became slightly estranged during the last part of 1897. Increased debts, business costs, employee benefits and other economic factors were the main part of the problem. Carpenter offered to resign as general manager, but this was not accepted until March 1898.

The armor-piercing projectiles used during the Spanish–American War of 1898, which devastated the Spanish fleets, were Carpenter projectiles. Letters later sent to Carpenter and to the Carpenter Steel Company gave glowing reports of their projectiles.

== Death and legacy ==
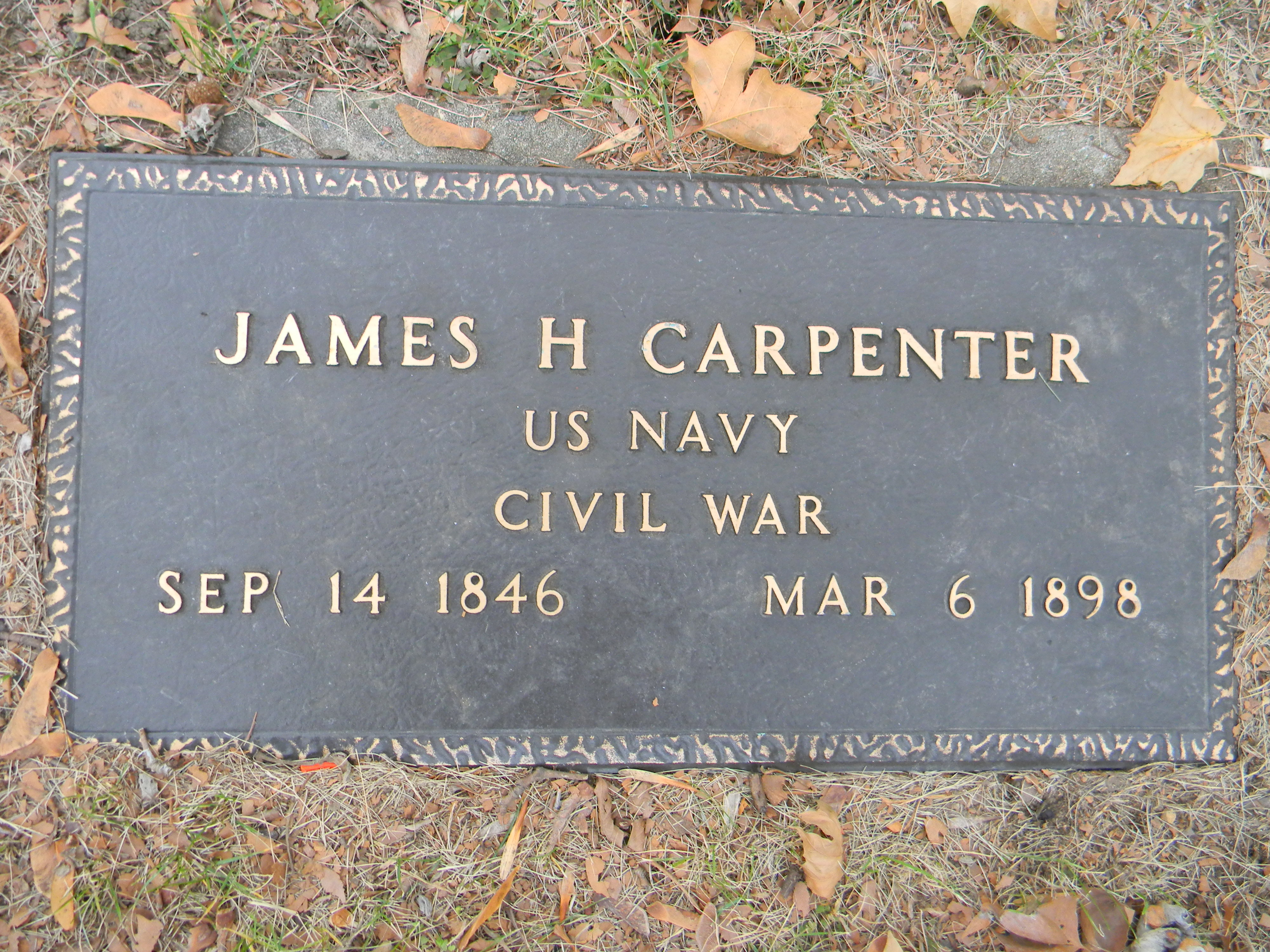
Grave

Carpenter never saw the letters, nor the success of his steel projectiles. During the frantic days of mid February 1898, he worked long hours. He caught a cold but continued to walk to and from the foundry even during the cold rains. By the beginning of March he was bedridden, and on March 6 he died in his bed of pneumonia, aged 51. He was buried in Charles Evans Cemetery.

Within three months of his death, Carpenter's house and other belongings were sold to satisfy the debt collectors. It was not enough, and board members of Carpenter Steel Company had to pay the remainder. His wife and children became destitute and moved back to Brooklyn to be with the family. She was given $300 to restart her life, and from 1904 she received a widow's pension from the US Government.

In early 1899, after the end of the Spanish–American War, the US Navy canceled its contracts because of overstocking. With no other business opportunities pending, the company struggled for several years. The court appointed Robert E. Jennings, a marketing expert and former vice-president of another steel company, as receiver in 1903, and he turned the company around. He was elected company president in 1904 and led the company through several years of innovation. Carpenter special steel was used in the early airplanes of the Wright brothers and in Glenn Curtiss aircraft and continues to be used in many types of high-performance craft.

== Gallery ==
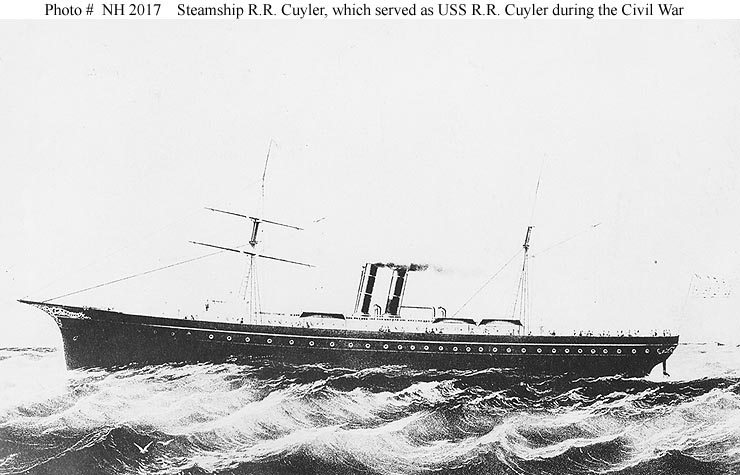
Steamer USS R.R. Cuyler about 1860

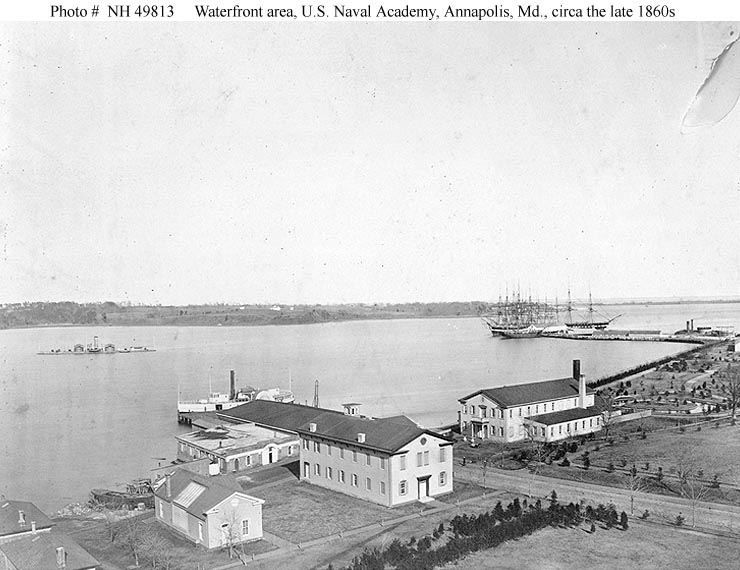
USNA waterfront in the late 1860s with the barrack/school ships USS Constitution and Santee tied up in the background. Other ships not identified.

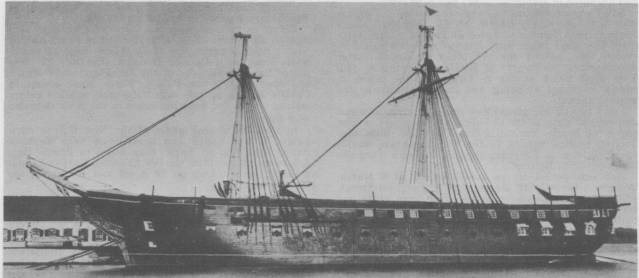
USS Santee being used as a training ship, classroom and barracks ship about 1875 at the USNA

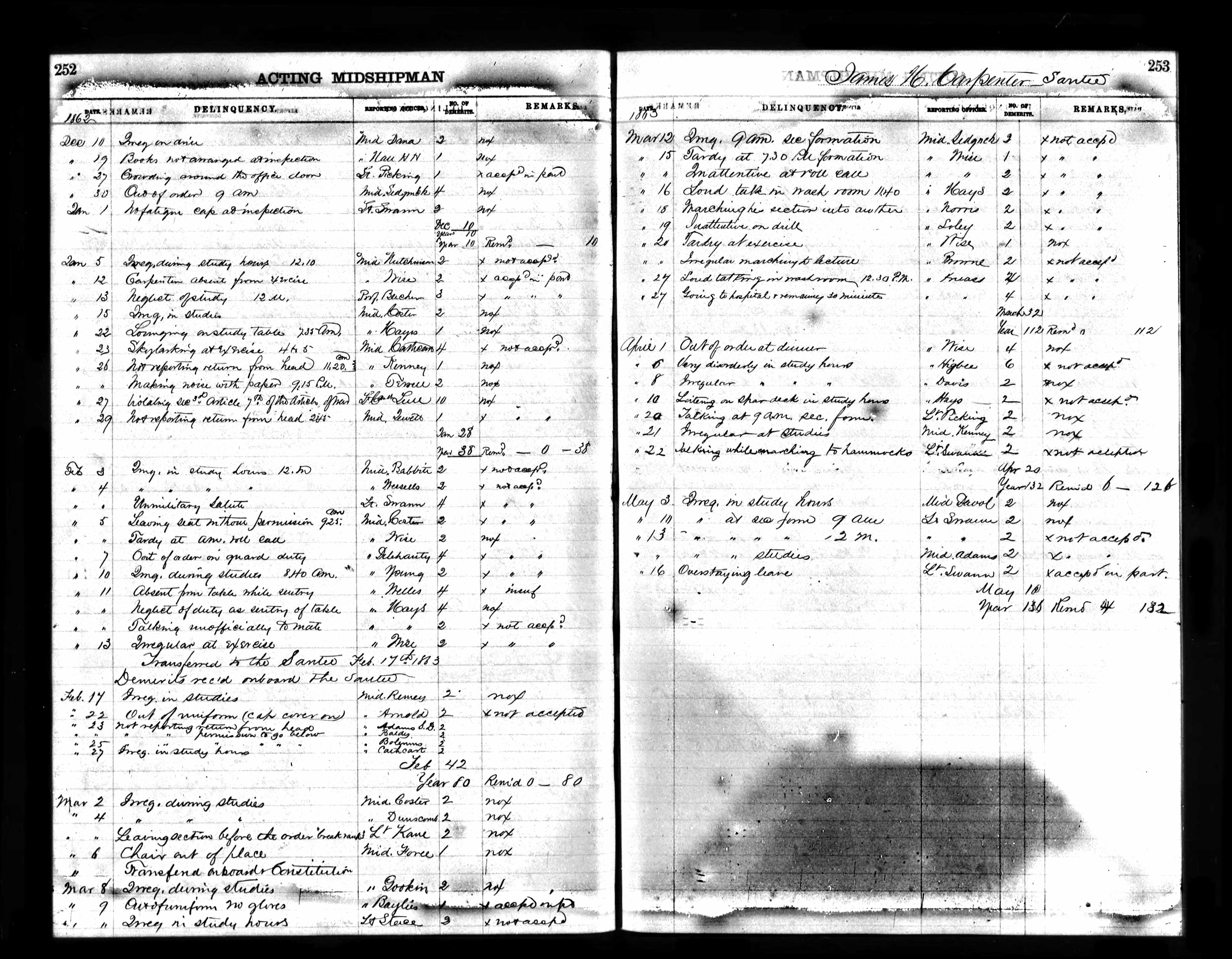
1865 USNA demerit log for James Henry Carpenter

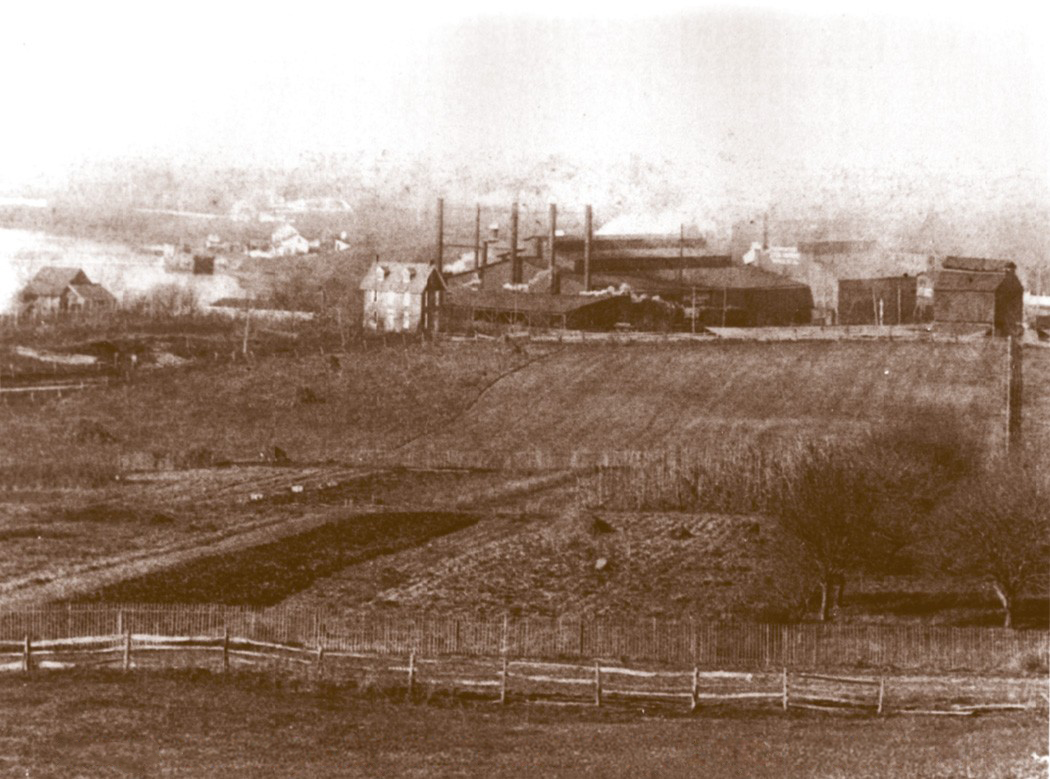
Carpenter Steel Company plant in 1893, Reading, Pa, looking east

== See also ==
- List of people with surname Carpenter
