= Atria Management Company =

American senior living management company

Atria Senior Living, LLC
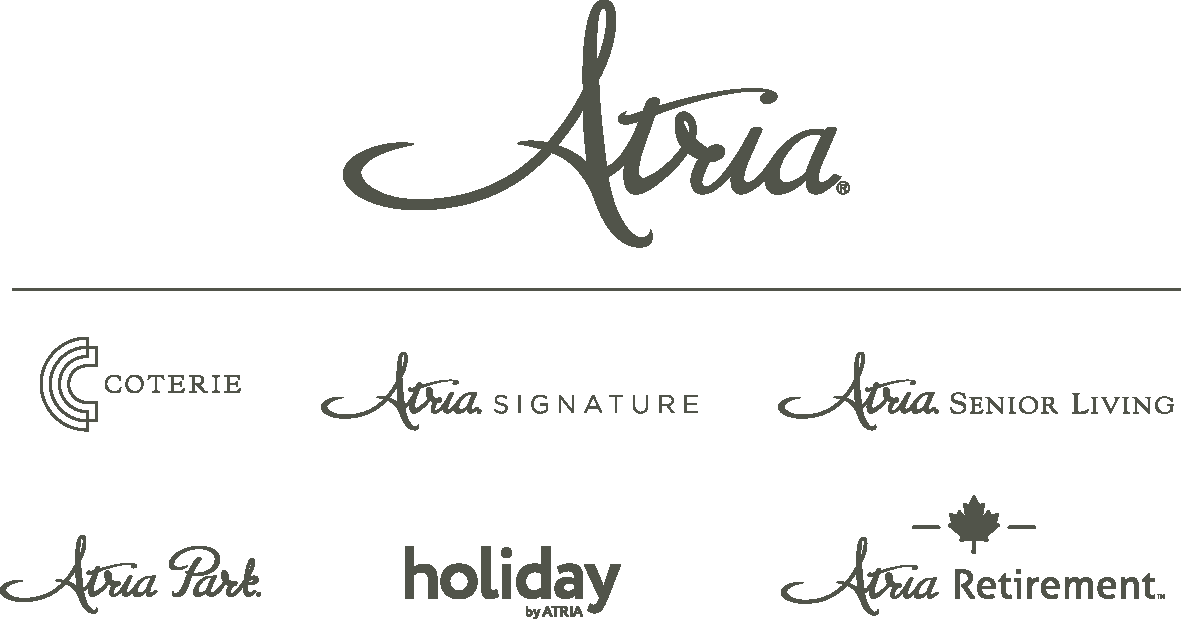
- Type: Private
- Industry: Senior Living
- Founded: 1996
- Headquarters: Louisville, Kentucky, U.S.
- Key people: Holly Belter-Chesser, CEO
- Website: www.atriaseniorliving.com

Atria Management Company, LLC (AMC), also known as Atria Senior Living, is a subsidiary of Atria Senior Living, Inc. (ASL). Atria Management Company manages independent living, assisted living, and memory care communities in more than 200 locations in 38 U.S. states. In Canada, Atria manages 29 independent living communities in seven Canadian provinces. Collectively, Atria communities are the residence of choice for approximately 35,000 senior adults and the company employs more than 10,000 employees. Atria is based in Louisville, Kentucky.

In the U.S., Atria communities are concentrated along the east and west coasts, including 21 communities in metropolitan New York, and 42 in California with concentrations in the Bay Area, Orange County and Los Angeles markets. Atria also has a significant presence in metropolitan areas including Toronto, Boston, Houston, Atlanta, Dallas, Seattle, and Portland.

== Brands ==
Coterie is a joint venture between Atria and Related Companies that offers senior living and care in cities across the country. The Atria Signature Collection communities feature apartments, amenities, and care primarily in coastal markets. Atria Park communities provide care, concierge service, and advanced-stage memory care, catering to seniors in upmarket urban and suburban cities. Atria Senior Living communities have a focus on assisted living, primarily in suburban markets. Holiday by Atria provides independent living for older adults at what it calls "an approachable price point". Atria Retirement Canada offers independent living to older adults from British Columbia to New Brunswick.

== History ==
=== 1990s and founding ===
Atria began in 1996 when Vencor spun off its assisted living and independent living senior living communities into a public company called Atria Communities, Inc. It had 22 communities in 13 states with a total of 3,022 units, including 650 Assisted Living units and 2,372 Independent Living units.

In 1998, a real estate private equity fund sponsored by an affiliate of Lazard Freres and Company (Lazard Freres Real Estate Investors, ”LFREI”) purchased Atria Communities, Inc. for approximately $750 million, merging Atria with its Kapson Senior Quarters unit.

=== 2000s ===
In June 2003, Atria announced it was merging with ARV Assisted Living of Costa Mesa, California which was also owned by an affiliate of Lazard Freres Real Estate Investors LLC^{.} On October 1, 2003, Atria Senior Living Group (“Atria”) named John A. Moore as Chief Executive Officer of the combined Atria-ARV company.

=== 2010s ===
By 2010, Atria had become the nation's fourth largest senior living provider. In October 2010, Ventas, Inc. (NYSE: VTR) announced that it would acquire Atria's real estate assets for a total purchase price of $3.1 billion, using 24.6 million shares of Ventas common stock, worth approximately $1.35 billion, $150 million in cash and the assumption or repayment of $1.6 billion of net debt. As part of the transaction, Atria was spun off as a management services business owned by LFREI affiliated funds and members of the Atria management team, and would continue to manage the assets sold to Ventas.

In late 2012, Ventas and members of Atria's senior executive team acquired the 85% of Atria owned by the LFREI funds, resulting in Atria being owned 66% by the Atria senior executive team and 34% by Ventas.

In 2014, Atria moved its Louisville, Kentucky headquarters to downtown Louisville and expanded its space again in 2017.

By 2016, Atria had more than doubled its revenue under management to over $1.3 billion.

In September 2017, Atria's response to Hurricane Irma resulted in evacuating nearly 1,000 residents, staff, and staff family members from Florida communities to the Walt Disney World Swan and Dolphin Resort in Orlando.

In December 2017, Fremont Realty Capital, the investment office of the Bechtel family of San Francisco, acquired 50% of the Atria senior executive team's ownership, providing an infusion of investment capital for innovation, growth, and property development. The transaction resulted in an ownership mix of 33% Atria senior team, 33% Fremont, and 34% Ventas.

In 2018, Atria announced a joint venture with luxury real estate firm Related Companies to develop, own and manage more than $3 billion worth of senior living communities in major, urban markets across the U.S. The joint venture initially includes sites in New York City, San Francisco and Boston, while targeting Los Angeles, Miami, Washington D.C., and other major metropolitan areas.

In November 2018, the company safely evacuated all of its Atria Paradise residents and staff from the devastating California “Camp Fire” that destroyed some 1,000 structures and took multiple lives.

=== 2020s ===
In July 2021, Atria became the country's second-largest senior living operator with the completion of its acquisition of the management services business of Holiday Retirement, a Winter Park, Florida-based independent living provider. It now operates as Holiday by Atria.

According to the J.D. Power 2021 U.S. Senior Living Satisfaction Study^{SM} Atria Senior Living ranked highest in family member / decision-maker overall satisfaction with assisted living and memory care providers.

In May 2021, Atria staff had reportedly reached a 98% vaccination rate as a result of a vaccine mandate announced in January 2021. In October 2021, Atria and its Holiday subsidiary reported near 100-percent staff vaccine participation rates.

In 2021, Atria began marketing Glennis Solutions, a company developing operations management software, to other senior living providers.

In October 2022, it was announced that Glennis Solutions would combine with two other companies, Enquire and Sherpa, to create a comprehensive software platform for the senior living industry called Aline. The move fulfilled Atria's intentions for Glennis to be a completely independent business serving industry operators with a full suite of business applications. The combined company will reportedly serve more than 50 of the largest 150 senior housing operators, and more than 800 customers in total, representing 5,700 communities across the senior living, post-acute and home care sectors.

In 2023, 49 Atria communities received the Caring Star Award from senior living industry referral website Caring.com, leading senior living providers in the number selected.

In March 2024, Holly Belter-Chesser assumed the role of Atria's CEO.
