= Carpenter Technology Corporation =

American manufacturer

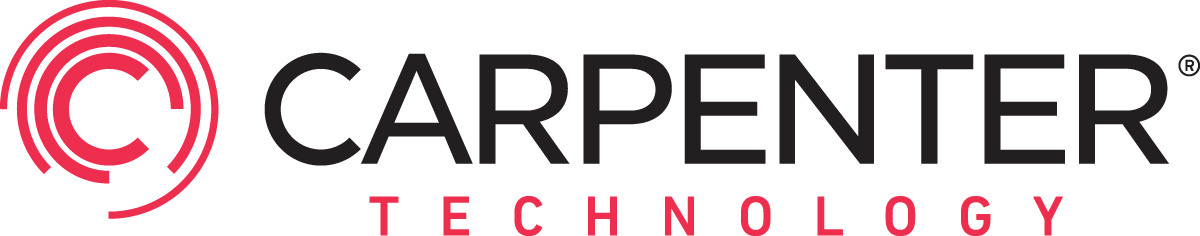
- Type: Public
- Traded as: NYSE: CRS; S&P 400 component
- Industry: Metal
- Founded: 1889; 137 years ago in Reading, Pennsylvania
- Founder: James Henry Carpenter
- Headquarters: Philadelphia, United States
- Key people: Tony R. Thene, [CEO]
- Production output: ▼221.784 million lb (FY20)
- Revenue: ▼US$2.181 billion (FY20)
- Net income: ▼US$1.5 million (FY20)
- Total assets: ▲US$3.227 billion (FY20)
- Total equity: ▼US$1.446 billion (FY20)
- Number of employees: ▼4,600 (June 30, 2020)
- Website: www.carpentertechnology.com

Carpenter Technology Corporation develops, manufactures, and distributes stainless steels and corrosion-resistant nickel, copper and titanium alloys as well as powdered alloys for 3D additive manufacturing. In fiscal year 2018, the company's revenues were derived from the aerospace and defense industry (55%), the industrial and consumer industry (17%), the medical industry (8%), the transportation industry (7%), the energy industry (7%), and the distribution industry (6%). The company's products are used in landing gear, shaft collars, safety wires, electricity generation products, intervertebral disc arthroplasty, and engine valves and weldings.

== History ==
The company was founded by James Henry Carpenter and a small group of New York City investors in Reading, Pennsylvania on June 7, 1889, as the Carpenter Steel Company.

In November 1896, the United States Secretary of the Navy referred to the company's armor-piercing projectiles as "the first made that would pierce improved armor plate." The routing of the Spanish fleet in the Battle of Manila Bay during the Spanish–American War of 1898 was credited in part to projectiles made by Carpenter.

In 1903, Carpenter's "special" steels were used in the engine of the Wright brothers' maiden flight.

In 1905, the company developed a prime grade chrome-nickel steel and by 1908 it had created 10 other steels that were used to make automobile chassis. "Old 16", the race car that won the Vanderbilt Cup in 1908, included front and rear axles, crankshaft, gears, and other parts fabricated from Carpenter steel.

In 1917, the company manufactured its first high-strength, chemical-resistant stainless steel, which was immediately used in airplane engine components, cutlery, and spark plugs.

Components of the engine of the "Spirit of St. Louis", Charles Lindbergh's plane that flew across the Atlantic Ocean in May 1927, were made from Carpenter steel. An identical engine had powered Richard E. Byrd's flight to the North Pole in 1926.

In 1928, the company introduced the first free machining steel. It was 0.15% sulfur to make it easier to machine.

In 1929, the Pierce-Arrow Motor Car Company used 24 pounds of stainless steel as trim on each of its cars.

In 1934, during the Great Depression, the company introduced new stainless steels with additives of selenium, tellurium, and chrome and nickel.

During World War II, the company's stainless steel was used in engine parts, steel fasteners, and cockpit instruments for fighter planes and bombers; components of Sherman tanks and submarines; radio masts for PT boats and radio equipment for battle fronts; and medical supplies such as hypodermic needles and surgical implements.

In 1951, the company introduced "Stainless 20," a corrosion-resistant alloy.

=== Structure ===
In June 1937, Carpenter Steel Company became a public company via an initial public offering.

=== Ownership and acquisitions ===
In 1957, after Northeastern Steel filed bankruptcy, it was acquired by Carpenter.

In 1961, the company acquired NTH Products of El Cajon, California.

In 1968, the company changed its name to Carpenter Technology Corporation to reflect its research and development initiatives.

In 1969, the company acquired Gardner Cryogenics, but sued its former shareholders a year later after finding irregularities. The company was sold a few years later.

In May 1983, the company acquired Eagle Precision Metals of Fryeburg, Maine, a precision drilling facility that produced high quality hollow steel bars.

In 1984, the company acquired a wire-finishing plant, capable of redrawing steel wire to extremely fine sizes from AMAX Specialty Metals of Orangeburg, South Carolina. The plant was closed in 2012.

In January 1997, Carpenter acquired Dynamet, a titanium alloy producer based in Washington, Pennsylvania, for $161 million.

In September 1997, the company acquired Talley Industries for $185 million.

In July 1998, the company sold John J. McMullen Associates and Waterbury Companies.

In October 1998, the company announced a $113.6 million investment to expand its Reading, Pennsylvania melt shop.

In January 2011, the company acquired Amega West Services for $54 million, which expanded its business in the oil and gas drilling market.

In February 2012, the company purchased the former Dana Incorporated industrial site for about $6 million.

=== Strike ===
In September 1986, 498 employees of the company participated in a strike action. The strike ended in December 1986.

=== Patent ===
In February 1992, the company received a patent for a super-strong Aermet alloy, first used for the landing gear on aircraft carrier-based jet fighters.

In 1993, the company developed 14 alloys for knife blades.

=== Leadership ===
In 2006, Carpenter Technology Corporation appointed Anne L. Stevens as their chairman, president and chief executive officer, succeeding Robert J. Torcolini. She became the first female CEO in the company's history.

In June 2015, Tony R. Thene was named president and chief executive officer of the company.

=== Alloy launches ===
In October 2009, the company introduced the cobalt-based BioBlu 27 alloy for the jewelry industry.

In December 2009, the company launched the PremoMet alloy for high demand diesel engine components.

In March 2010, the company introduced the ACUBE 100 alloy, a beryllium-free material for bushings and bearings.

=== Developments ===
In August 2012, the company announced plans to construct a manufacturing facility in China.

In July 2018, the company announced plans to invest $52 million in a research and development center on its campus in Athens, Alabama.

== Controversies ==
=== Environmental record ===
On June 18, 2002, five plaintiffs filed a suit against the company to recover costs that had been paid to the United States Environmental Protection Agency to cleanup the Boarhead Farms Superfund site in Bucks County, Pennsylvania. A settlement of $21,800,000 was reached in 2011.

The company released more than 1.2 million pounds of toxic chemical waste (nitrate) into the Schuylkill River and was the 4th-largest polluter of toxic chemicals in Pennsylvania in 2007. Their state wastewater permit shows, however, that there is no actual limit imposed on them for nitrate; instead, they are only required to monitor and report the level of nitrate in their wastewater. This decision was based, in part, on the amount of water flowing in the Schuylkill River, the company's daily wastewater volume (around 1 million gallons per day), and the resulting likelihood of actual environmental impact.

== Gallery ==
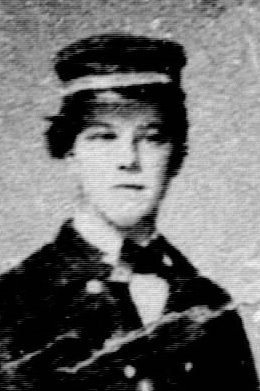
James Henry Carpenter in 1861 or 1862 in the Union Navy at about age 15.

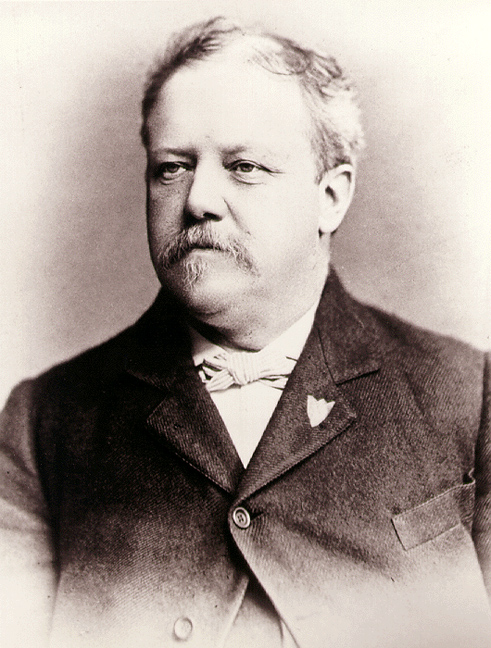
James Henry Carpenter, about 1895.

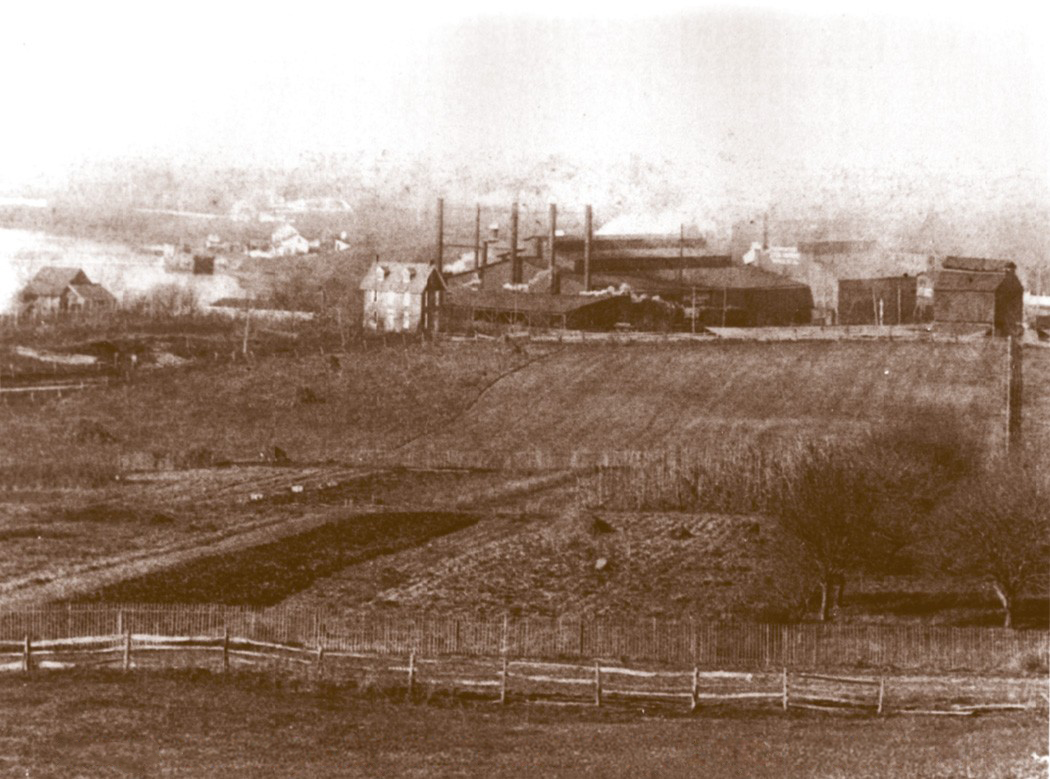
Carpenter Steel Company Plant in 1893, Reading, Pa, looking east.

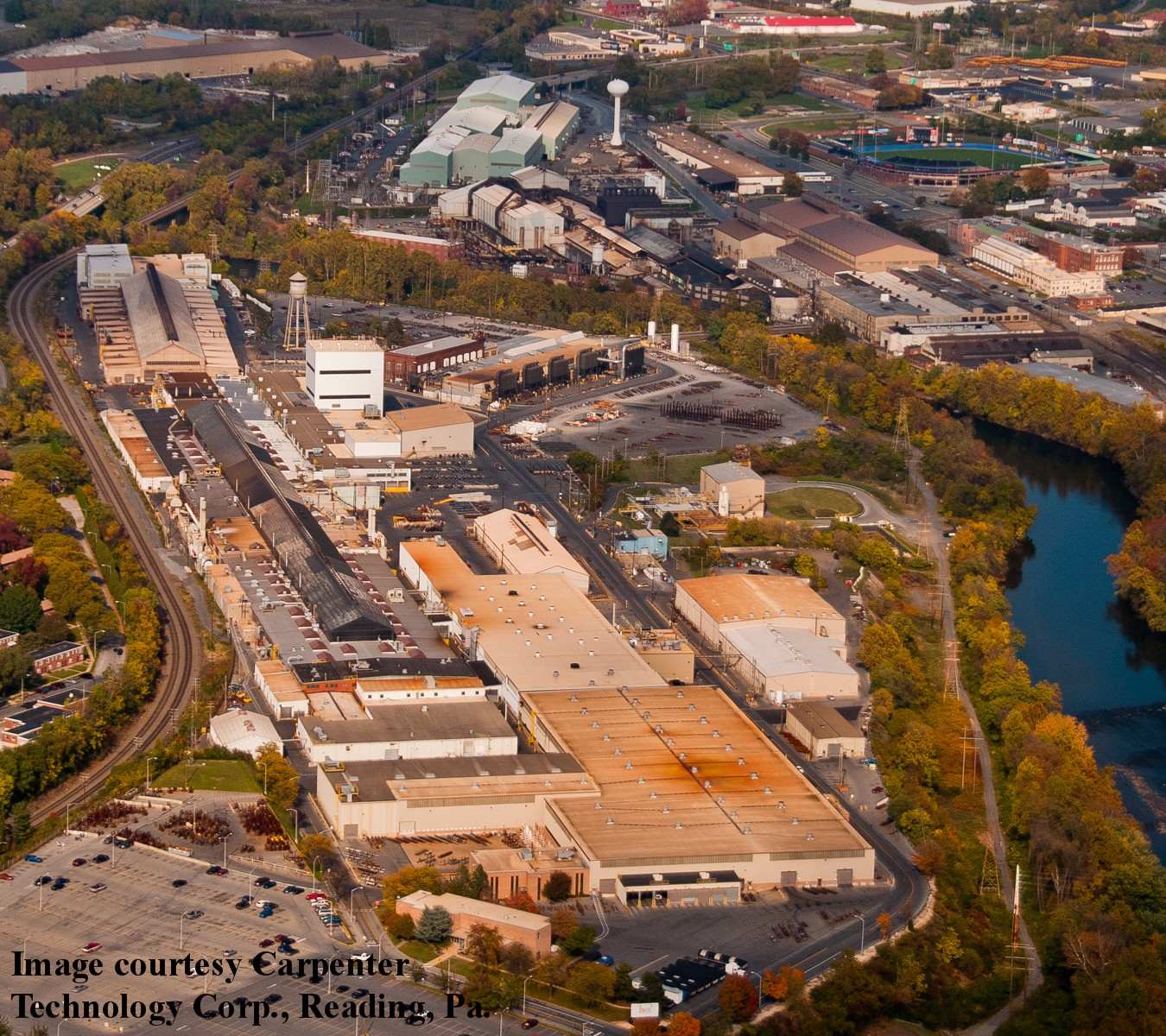
Carpenter plant, circa 2010, looking north.

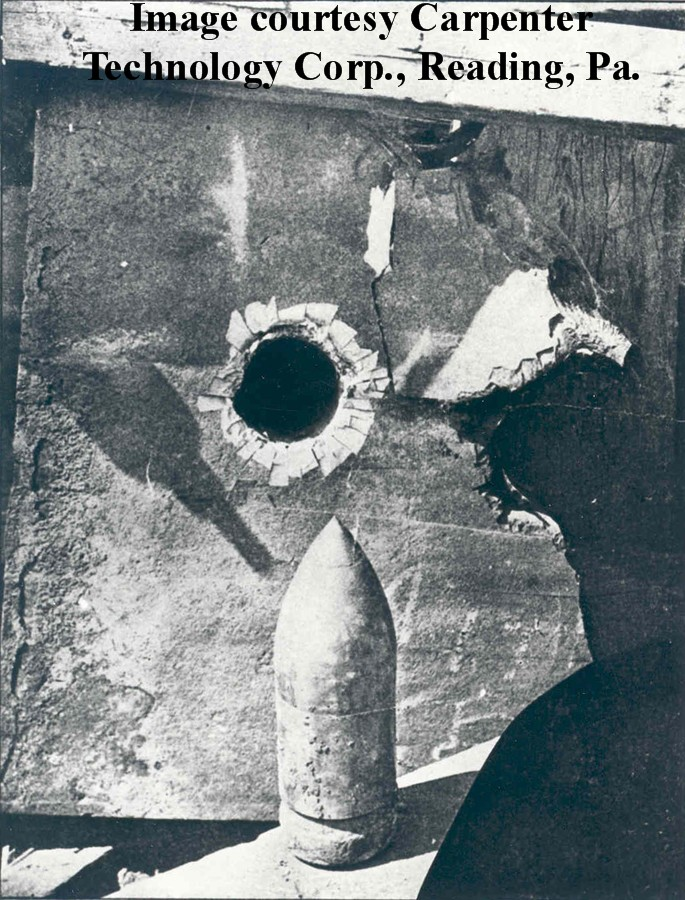
Carpenter projectile test on steel plate circa early 1890s.

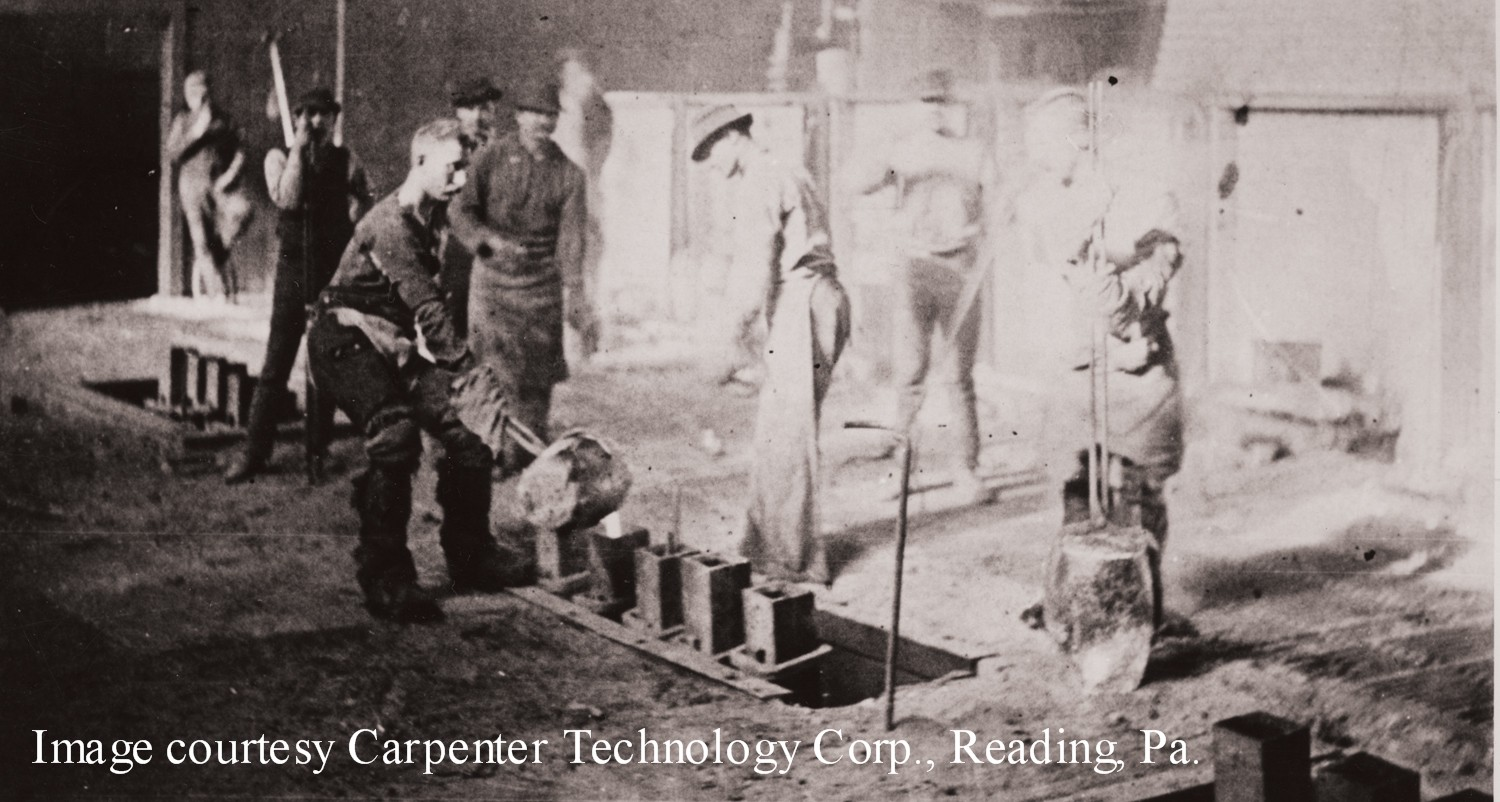
Carpenter in the 1890s pouring steel into crucibles.

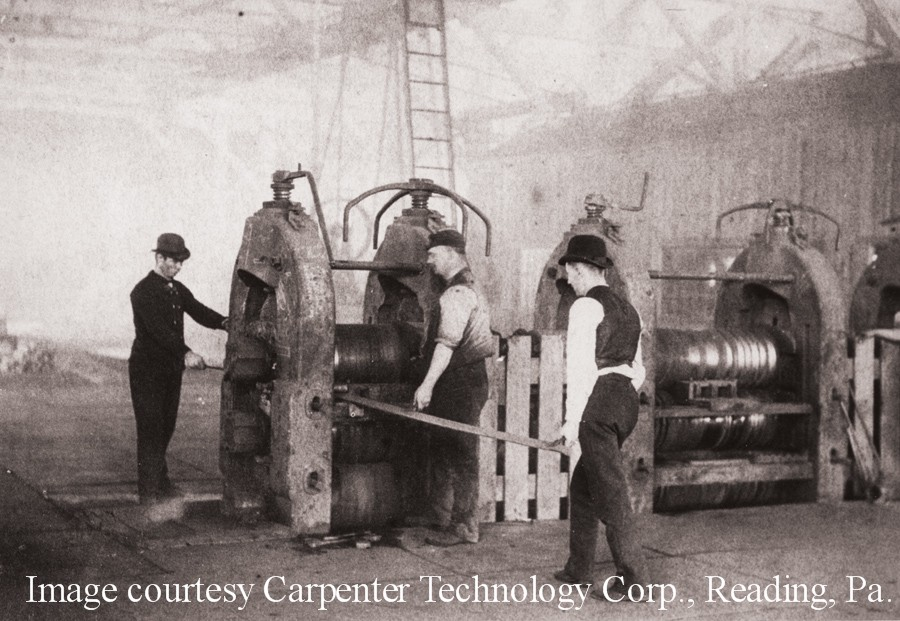
Carpenter rolling mill in the 1890s.

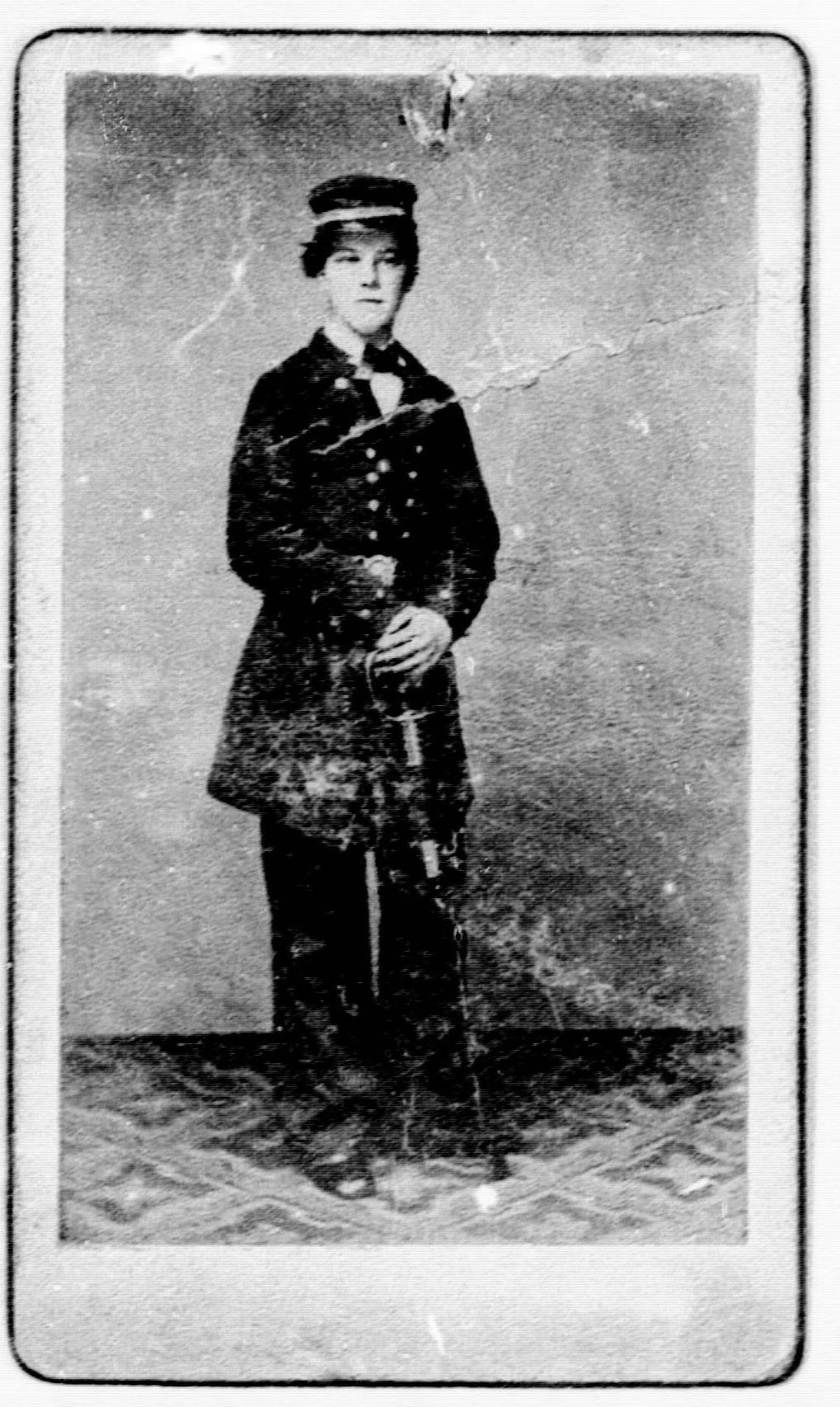
Full picture: James Henry Carpenter in 1861 or 1862 in the Union Navy at about age 15.
