= Omar Romero-Hernandez =

Mexican academic

- Born: Mexico
- Education: Imperial College London
- Known for: Franz Edelman Award winner

Dr. Omar Romero-Hernandez is a Mexican academic, engineer, and researcher who currently serves as a professor at U.C. Berkeley's Haas School of Business and at the Hult International Business School. He was the recipient of the 2010 Franz Edelman Award for Achievement in Operations Research and the Management Sciences.

== Education ==
Romero-Hernandez holds a bachelor's in chemical engineering from the Universidad Nacional Autónoma de México and a doctorate in economics and environmental engineering from Imperial College, London. He was a Fulbright fellow.

== Career ==
Romero-Hernandez has led several awarded energy-related projects in the field of sustainable business strategies, renewable energy and business processes through work with the United Nations, the Mexican Secretariat of the Environment, and PEMEX, among others. In 2010, he was appointed project leader of Mexico’s Business Summit task force on Economic Growth and Low Carbon Emissions, which delivers recommendations to the President.

Romero-Hernandez has been a lecturer (non-tenure track) in the Haas School of Business at the University of California, Berkeley since 2009.

Romero-Hernandez was appointed project leader of Mexico’s Business Summit Task force on Economic Growth and Low Carbon Emissions in 2010, working directly under the President of Mexico, Felipe Calderón.

Since 2013, Romero-Hernandez has been a faculty member at the Hult International Business School.

== Recognitions ==
In 2010, Romero‐Hernandez was the recipient of the Franz Edelman Award for Achievement in Operations Research and the Management Sciences, one of the most prestigious awards in operations and management in the United States.

== Publications ==
- “A Multi-objective Mathematical Programming Framework for a Sustainability Analysis of Wastewater Treatment Processes,” (with A. Ponsich, S. Romero-Hernández, M. De Lascurain, and J. Aquino), International Journal of Environmental Policy and Decision-Making, 2010, 1(1): 17-39.
- “Environmental Implications and Market Analysis of Soft Drink Packaging Systems in Mexico: A Waste Management Approach,” (with Sergio Romero, David Muñoz, Emiliano Detta, Arturo Palacios, and Adriana Laguna), International Journal of Life Cycle Assessment, 2009, 14(2):107-113.
- “Bioenergy, Sustainability and Tradeoffs: Analysis of the Legal and Institutional Frameworks at National and Subnational Levels in Mexico,” (with Omar Masera, Sergio Romero, and Miriam Grunstein), working paper, 2010.
- “Environmental Cooperation System for the Steel Industry in Mexico – A Case Study” (with Tony Kingsbury, Sergio Romero, Mariana Icaza, and Emiliano Diaz), working paper, 2010.
- “Renewable Energy in Mexico” (with Wood, D. and Romero, S.), USA Aid Research, 2011.
- "Un video ma mi gente me encanta esta vaina"*
