= Ronald E. Goldsberry =

African-American scientist and businessman

Ronald E. Goldsberry is an African-American scientist and businessman is known for his contributions to the chemical industry and his leadership positions at the Ford Motor Company. He had executive roles across various Fortune 500 Companies, was elected to the National Academy of Engineering in 1993, and remains active in civil leadership and mentorship efforts.

== Early life and education ==
Goldsberry was born September 12, 1942, in Wilmington, Delaware. Raised by his mother and stepfather in a modest neighborhood, he developed a work ethic and a passion for science early on. His desire to connect with his father, a medical doctor in Detroit, influenced his decision to study in Michigan, allowing them to build a relationship during his graduate years. He went on to pursue a B.S in Chemistry at Central State University in 1964, and then a Ph.D. in Physical & Organic Chemistry at Michigan State University in 1969.

== Career ==
Before pursuing his MBA at Stanford in 1973, Goldsberry worked as a research chemist at NASA's Ames Research Center and taught chemistry at the University of California at San Jose. He worked for Hewlett-Packard, Boston Consulting Company, Gulf Oil Corporation, Occidental Chemical Corporation, and Parker Chemical Company during his career. When Ford Motor Company acquired Parker in 1983, Goldsberry was appointed as Parker's president and chief operating officer. He advanced through Ford and retired in 2000 as worldwide vice president for customer services.

After consulting on automotive practices for Deloitte Consulting from 2001 to 2013, he became an independent consultant. During his time at Ford, he oversaw the company’s response to the largest automotive recall in U.S. history, involving defective ignition switches. Goldsberry also was Chairman and CEO of Newport News Industrial Corporation and held board positions at DTE Energy and Plastipak Packaging. He has been involved with the National Black MBA Association and 100 Black Men of Greater Detroit.

== Recognition and awards ==
In 1993, Goldsberry was elected a member of the National Academy of Engineering. He has been on the boards of Unum/Provident Corporation, Michigan State University Alumni Association, Case Corporation, Central State University, Stanford University Graduate School of Business, and Detroit’s public television station, WTVS-TV.

Goldsberry was the only African American CEO of a U.S. chemical company in the 1980s, and served two years as a U.S. Army captain.

== Personal life ==
Goldsberry is dedicated to expanding educational opportunities for disadvantaged populations and mentoring young professionals. He remains actively involved in civic organizations in Detroit, Michigan.
