= Anne L. Stevens =

US mechanical and materials engineer

Anne Louise Stevens
- Born: 1948 (age 77–78); Reading, Pennsylvania
- Education: Drexel University
- Scientific career
- Fields: Mechanical engineering Materials engineering
- Workplaces: GKN Aerospace; Lockheed Martin; Carpenter Technology; Ford Motor Company; ExxonMobil

Anne Louise Stevens (born 1948) is an American mechanical and materials engineer. She is currently a non-executive director at Anglo American plc. She was the CEO of GKN Aerospace until it was acquired by Melrose plc in a hostile takeover in 2018. Previously, Stevens was chairman of the Board of Directors, President and chief executive officer of Carpenter Technology Corporation and vice president of North America Vehicle Operations for Ford Motor Company.

== Early life and education ==
Stevens was born in Reading, Pennsylvania, in 1948. In high school, she disguised herself in order to enrol in the male-only mechanics pit crew at a race track. After graduation, Stevens enrolled in nursing but dropped out and took a job at Bell Telephone where she met her future husband.

Stevens and her husband enrolled at Drexel University and she graduated with a bachelor's degree in mechanical and materials engineering.

== Career ==
After earning her degrees, Stevens worked at the Exxon Chemical Company for ten years in multiple engineering and manufacturing positions. She then joined the Ford Motor Company in 1990 as a marketing specialist. Stevens was promoted at various times during her tenure at Ford. In 1992, she was named manager of a Quality Services Department and by 2001, was named vice president of North America Vehicle Operations. In 2000, Stevens was the recipient of the Shingo Leadership Award and was later appointed to the Shingo Prize Board of Governors. In 2003, Stevens received the Eli Whitney Award from the Society of Manufacturing Engineers and was promoted to group vice president of Canada, Mexico, and South America branches of the Ford Motor Company. The next year, she was elected to the National Academy of Engineering and honoured by the Automotive Hall of Fame.

In 2005, she became the first woman executive vice president in the history of the Ford Motor Company. However, this title was short-lived as she resigned in September 2006 alongside Dave Szczupak. The next month, Stevens was appointed chairman, President and chief executive officer of Carpenter Technology, succeeding Robert J. Torcolini. Upon her promotion, Stevens became the company's first female CEO. In 2007, Stevens donated $1 million to Drexel University to start the Anne L. Stevens Scholarship Program for Young Women. In 2008, Stevens was honoured with the Best 50 Women in Business Award. She was also elected to serve on the Albright College Board of Trustees on a three-year term. She stayed in her role as CEO until 2009, when she resigned and Carpenter Technology split her roles into separate positions. As a result of the resignation and split, Stevens received a cash payment of $1.76 million. Moving on from Carpenter, Stevens focused on her non-executive director position at Lockheed Martin until she stepped down at the end of 2017 to become chief executive officer of GKN Aerospace.
