= Holiday Retirement =

U.S. senior living management company

- Type: Privately held company
- Industry: Independent Living and Assisted Living for Seniors management
- Founded: 1971; 55 years ago in Salem, Oregon
- Founder: William E. Colson and Hugh Colson
- Defunct: 2021
- Fate: Operations acquired by Atria and properties acquired by Welltower.
- Successor: Holiday by Atria
- Headquarters: Winter Park, Florida, United States
- Area served: United States
- Key people: William E. Colson (Founder) Hugh Colson (Founder) Lilly Donohue (Final CEO)
- Products: Senior residential and assisted living
- Owner: Atria Management Company (Operations) Welltower Inc. (Properties)
- Parent: Atria Management Company
- Website: Holiday Retirement (official website)

Holiday Retirement, originally known as Holiday Management Company, was a U.S. senior living management company with headquarters in Winter Park, Florida. Founded in 1971 by William E. Colson and his father, Hugh Colson, Holiday Retirement was a privately held company that managed over 240 retirement communities with over 25,000 total residents, making it one of the largest providers of independent senior living.

Private equity firm Fortress Investment Group acquired Holiday Retirement in 2007, which subsequently sold the business to be merged with Kentucky-based Atria Management Company. It now operates as Holiday by Atria, with operations handled by Atria and the physical properties owned by the Welltower REIT.

== History ==
William E. Colson and his father, Hugh Colson, founded Holiday Management Company in Salem, Oregon in 1971. William Colson was also President and Managing General Partner for Holiday Management Company's in-house company, Colson & Colson General Contractor, Inc.

=== Founding and early history ===
The company's first community, Kamlu Retirement Inn-Vancouver, opened in Vancouver, Washington on November 1, 1971. Holiday Management Company added a second community, Edgewood Downs, in Beaverton, Oregon on June 1, 1977.

Holiday Retirement's first nine communities were only in the western United States, largely in Washington, Oregon, California, and Idaho. The company expanded east by opening Harrison Regent in Ogden, Utah on July 1, 1985. Communities were also built in Pueblo, Colorado; Colorado Springs, Colorado; and Amarillo, Texas in 1985. The Victorian became Holiday Retirement's first Canadian community, opening on August 1, 1987 in Victoria, British Columbia; however, Holiday Retirement sold its Canadian communities in 2014.

The company's name changed to Holiday Retirement in 1987, and it acquired or built multiple communities every year from 1988 to 2009. The company's largest growth occurred in 1998 and 1999 with the addition of 22 properties in both years.

=== Fortress Investment Group ===
Colson sold Holiday Retirement in 2007 to Fortress Investment Group LLC of New York. Colson died of colon cancer on May 20, 2007. Upon selling Holiday, Colson agreed to a five-year stay on building new retirement communities and then in their sixth year, they began building under the name "Hawthorn".

Holiday Retirement headquarters were officially relocated to Lake Oswego, Oregon on April 16, 2012. Five years later, the company announced it would be moving its headquarters again to Winter Park, Florida in April 2017. The move was completed in July 2017. Fortress Investment Group later became a subsidiary of Softbank Group in December 2017.

=== Atria Senior Living ===
Fortress sold Holiday Retirement to Atria Senior Living, based in Louisville, Kentucky, in a deal announced in 2021. The merger brought together the third (Holiday) and seventh (Atria) largest senior living community operators nationwide. At the time of the sale, the properties transferred onwership to Welltower, a real estate investment trust. The deal was valued at over $1.5 billion.

The combined company expected to become the second-largest retirement home operator nationwide upon the deal's closing. The combined company provides services for more than 45,000 residents, with over than 19,000 employees working in 447 communities across 45 states and seven Canadian provinces.

== Business model ==
Holiday Retirement was one of the first companies in the U.S. to develop independent living communities for seniors. Each community provides private apartments or cottages.

Unlike nursing homes or assisted living communities, the majority of properties operated under the Holiday brand are independent retirement living communities, where residents are not provided skilled nursing or assistance with daily activities such as bathing, dressing, eating, or assistance with taking medication.

== Philanthropy, veterans initiatives, and wellness programs ==
Holiday Retirement developed the Seniors Serving Seniors and Seniors Serving Society programs, which coordinate volunteer opportunities for residents. The program was awarded in 2007 by the International Council on Active Aging (ICAA). Residents support a variety of local drives and fundraisers, including Toys for Tots, the American Red Cross, and The Humane Society. The company is a National Founding Partner in the Library of Congress' Veterans History Project, which collects and preserves veterans' personal accounts of war. Many veterans and veterans' spouses are residents of communities owned by Holiday Retirement.

Holiday Retirement developed the Seniors Serving Seniors and Seniors Serving Society programs, which coordinate volunteer opportunities for residents. The program was awarded in 2007 by the International Council on Active Aging (ICAA).

== Awards and recognition ==
- 2019 - 2020: Named a "Best Place to Work" by Fortune's list of Best Workplaces for Aging Services
