= Deborah Nightingale =

American management scientist, industrial engineer

Deborah J. Seifert Nightingale is an American management scientist, industrial engineer, and enterprise transformation consultant. She is University Distinguished Professor of Industrial Engineering & Management Systems at the University of Central Florida, past president of the Institute of Industrial Engineers, and a former professor of Engineering Systems and of Aeronautics and Astronautics at the Massachusetts Institute of Technology. Nightingale was elected a member of the National Academy of Engineering in 1993 for contributions to the expanding field of computer-integrated manufacturing as an instrument of industrial competitiveness. She is the 2020 winner of the Institute of Industrial and Systems Engineers Frank and Lillian Gilbreth Industrial Engineering Award.

Nightingale is a graduate of the University of Dayton, and has a Ph.D. in Industrial and Systems Engineering from Ohio State University. She was president of the Institute of Industrial Engineers for 1995–1996, served on the MIT faculty from 1997 to 2014, and joined the University of Central Florida faculty in 2017.

Nightingale is the author of books including Lean Enterprise Value: Insights from MIT's Lean Aerospace Initiative (with 12 other authors, 2002), Beyond the Lean Revolution: Achieving Successful and Sustainable Enterprise Transformation (with Jayakanth Srinivasan, 2011) and Architecting the Future Enterprise (with Donna H. Rhodes, 2015).
