= William L. Wearly =

American businessman

William L. Wearly (December 5, 1915 – April 30, 2010) was chief executive officer and chairman of Ingersoll-Rand Co. and chief executive officer and president of Joy Global. Wearly was elected to the National Academy of Engineering in 1990 "for leadership in the development and manufacture of equipment contributing to safety and productivity in mining and in related industries".
