= Yuehwern Yih =

Taiwanese-American industrial engineer and control theorist

Yuehwern Yih is a Taiwanese-American industrial engineer and control theorist. She is the Tompkins Professor in the Edwardson School of Industrial Engineering at Purdue University, where she directs the Smart Operations and Systems Laboratory and the LASER PULSE Consortium. Her research interests include the design, modeling, and control of dynamic and complex systems, with applications including industrial and humanitarian supply chains, healthcare, and food distribution. She is also a ballroom dancer and one of two head coaches of the Purdue Latin and Ballroom Dance Team.

== Education and career ==
Yih graduated from National Tsing Hua University in Taiwan in 1984. She continued her studies at the University of Wisconsin–Madison, where she completed her Ph.D. in 1988. Her dissertation, Trace driven knowledge acquisition for expert scheduling system, was supervised by Arne Thesen.

She became an assistant professor at Purdue University in 1989, and was named Tompkins Professor in 2023.

== Recognition ==
Yih was a 1998 recipient of the Outstanding Young Manufacturing Engineer Award of SME. She was the 2024 recipient of the IISE David F. Baker Distinguished Research Award, the first woman to receive the award.

She became a Fellow of the Institute of Industrial Engineers (now the Institute of Industrial and Systems Engineers) in 2009. She was named to the National Academy of Engineering in 2025, "for contributions to supply chain management systems in humanitarian relief efforts and health care". In the same year, she was also named the Senior Member of the National Academy of Inventors.

== Personal life ==
Yih and her husband, software engineer Daniel Dilley, are ballroom dance competitors and coaches who have led the Purdue ballroom dance team to national competitions, after founding the team in 1996. She is licensed as a general adjudicator and chairperson by the World DanceSport Federation.
