= Eletrobras Cepel =

Electrical energy research institution in Rio de Janeiro

Eletrobras Cepel S.A.
- Company type: Subsidiary
- Industry: Utilities
- Founded: 1974
- Headquarters: Rio de Janeiro, Brazil
- Products: Electricity generation
- Number of employees: 3,750
- Parent: Eletrobras
- Website: www.cepel.br

Eletrobras Cepel, or Center for Energy Research (Cepel), is a State Funded electrical energy research institution located in Rio de Janeiro, Brazil. It was founded in 1974 by Eletrobras and its subsidiaries: Chesf, Eletronorte, Eletrosul and Furnas.

Cepel has 30 laboratories, 20 of them are located in the headquarters in Rio de Janeiro city. The other ten labs are located in Nova Iguaçu (another city of Rio de Janeiro state), where works on high voltage, high current, etc. are developed.

Cepel is organized in five departments:

Name in Portuguese	Name in English	Acronym
Departamento de Automação de Sistemas	Systems Automation Department	DAS
Departamento de Sistemas Elétricos	Electric Systems Department	DSE
Departamento de Tecnologias Especiais	Special Technologies Department	DTE
Departamento de Instalações e Equipamentos	Equipment and Structure Department	DIE
Departamento de Otimização Energética e Meio Ambiente	Environment and Electric Optimization Department	DEA
