= Richard E. DeVor =

Richard Earl DeVor (1944–2011) was a College of Engineering Distinguished Professor of Manufacturing and research professor at the University of Illinois at Urbana-Champaign. His research interests consist of mathematical modeling/simulation of material removal processes and mathematical modeling of the end milling/face milling processes. He attained his PhD at the University of Wisconsin-Madison. He died in July 2011.
