= List of optimization software =

Given a transformation between input and output values, described by a mathematical function, optimization deals with generating and selecting the best solution from some set of available alternatives, by systematically choosing input values from within an allowed set, computing the output of the function and recording the best output values found during the process. Many real-world problems can be modeled in this way. For example, the inputs could be design parameters for a motor, the output could be the power consumption. For another optimization, the inputs could be business choices and the output could be the profit obtained.

An optimization problem, (in this case a minimization problem), can be represented in the following way:

Given: a function f : A $\to$ R from some set A to the real numbers
Search for: an element x_{0} in A such that f(x_{0}) ≤ f(x) for all x in A.

In continuous optimization, A is some subset of the Euclidean space R^{n}, often specified by a set of constraints, equalities or inequalities that the members of A have to satisfy. In combinatorial optimization, A is some subset of a discrete space, like binary strings, permutations, or sets of integers.

The use of optimization software requires that the function f is defined in a suitable programming language and connected at compilation or run time to the optimization software. The optimization software will deliver input values in A, the software module realizing f will deliver the computed value f(x) and, in some cases, additional information about the function like derivatives.

In this manner, a clear separation of concerns is obtained: different optimization software modules can be easily tested on the same function f, or a given optimization software can be used for different functions f.

The following tables provide a list of notable optimization software organized according to license and business model type.

== Free and open-source software ==
=== Applications ===
Name	License	Description
ADMB	BSD	nonlinear optimization framework using automatic differentiation.
ASCEND	GPL	mathematical modelling chemical process modelling system.
CUTEr	GPL	testing environment for optimization and linear algebra solvers.
GNU Octave	GPL	software package using a high-level programming language, primarily intended for numerical computations; it is mostly compatible with MATLAB.
Scilab	CeCILL	cross-platform numerical computational package and a high-level, numerically oriented programming language with a numerical optimization framework.

=== Software libraries ===
Name	License	Description
ALGLIB	GPL	dual licensed (GPL/commercial) optimization library (LP, QP and nonlinear programming problems), optionally using automatic differentiation. Cross-language: C++, C#.
COIN-OR	EPL 1.0	integer programming, linear programming, nonlinear programming.
Dlib	BSL‑1.0	unconstrained/box-constrained nonlinear/QP optimization library written in C++.
GEKKO	MIT	machine learning and optimization of mixed-integer and differential algebraic equations in Python.
GLPK	GPL	GNU Linear Programming Kit with C API.
HiGHS	MIT	linear programming (LP), mixed integer programming (MIP), and convex quadratic programming (QP).
IPOPT	EPL (was CPL)	large scale nonlinear optimizer for continuous systems (requires gradient), C++ (formerly Fortran and C). It became a part of COIN-OR.
MINUIT (now MINUIT2)	LGPL	unconstrained optimizer internally developed at CERN.
OpenMDAO	Apache License	Multidisciplinary Design, Analysis, and Optimization (MDAO) framework, written in Python. The development is led out of the NASA Glenn Research Center, with support from the NASA Langley Research Center.
OR-Tools	Apache License	Linear programming (LP), mixed integer programming (MIP), constraint programming (CP), vehicle routing (VRP), and related optimization problems.
SCIP	Apache License	solver for mixed integer programming (MIP) and mixed integer nonlinear programming (MINLP).
SciPy	BSD	general numeric package for Python, with some support for optimization.

== Proprietary software ==
- AIMMS – optimization modelling system, including GUI building facilities.
- ALGLIB – dual licensed (GPL/commercial) constrained quadratic and nonlinear optimization library with C++ and C# interfaces.
- Altair HyperStudy – design of experiments and multidisciplinary design optimization.
- AMPL – modelling language for large-scale linear, mixed integer and nonlinear optimization.
- ANTIGONE – a deterministic global optimization MINLP solver.
- APMonitor – modelling language and optimization suite for large-scale, nonlinear, mixed integer, differential, and algebraic equations with interfaces to MATLAB, Python, and Julia.
- Artelys Knitro – large scale nonlinear optimization for continuous and mixed-integer programming.
- ASTOS – AeroSpace Trajectory optimization Software for launch, re-entry, and generic aerospace problems.
- BARON – optimization of algebraic nonlinear and mixed-integer nonlinear problems.
- COMSOL Multiphysics – a cross-platform finite element analysis, solver and multiphysics simulation software.
- CPLEX – solver for linear and quadratic programming with continuous or integer variables (MIP).
- FEATool Multiphysics – FEA GUI Toolbox for MATLAB.
- FICO Xpress – solver for linear and quadratic programming with continuous or integer variables (MIP).
- FortMP – linear and quadratic programming.
- FortSP – stochastic programming.
- GAMS – General Algebraic Modeling System.
- Gurobi Optimizer – solver for linear and quadratic programming with continuous or integer variables (MIP).
- HEEDS MDO – multidisciplinary design optimization using SHERPA, a hybrid, adaptive optimization algorithm.
- IMSL Numerical Libraries – linear, quadratic, nonlinear, and sparse QP and LP optimization algorithms implemented in standard programming languages C, Java, C# .NET, Fortran, and Python.
- IOSO – (Indirect optimization on the basis of Self-Organization) a multi-objective, multidimensional nonlinear optimization technology.
- Kimeme – an open platform for multi-objective optimization and multidisciplinary design optimization.
- LINDO – (Linear, Interactive, and Discrete optimizer) a software package for linear programming, integer programming, nonlinear programming, stochastic programming, and global optimization. The "What's Best!" Excel add-in performs linear, integer, and nonlinear optimization using LINDO.
- LIONsolver – an integrated software for data mining, analytics, modelling Learning and Intelligent OptimizatioN and reactive business intelligence approach.
- modeFRONTIER – an integration platform for multi-objective and multidisciplinary optimization, which provides a seamless coupling with third party engineering tools, enables the automation of the design simulation process, and facilitates analytic decision-making.
- Maple – linear, quadratic, and nonlinear, continuous and integer optimization. Constrained and unconstrained. Global optimization with add-on toolbox.
- MATLAB – linear, integer, quadratic, and nonlinear problems with Optimization Toolbox; multiple maxima, multiple minima, and non-smooth optimization problems; estimation and optimization of model parameters.
- MIDACO a lightweight software tool for single- and multi-objective optimization based on evolutionary computing. Written in C/C++ and Fortran with gateways to Excel, VBA, Java, Python, Matlab, Octave, R, C#, and Julia.
- Mathematica – large-scale multivariate constrained and unconstrained, linear, quadratic and nonlinear, continuous, and integer optimization.
- ModelCenter – a graphical environment for integration, automation, and design optimization.
- MOSEK – linear, quadratic, conic and convex nonlinear, continuous, and integer optimization.
- NAG – linear, quadratic, nonlinear, sums of squares of linear or nonlinear functions; linear, sparse linear, nonlinear, bounded or no constraints; local and global optimizations; continuous or integer problems.
- NMath – linear, quadratic and nonlinear programming.
- Octeract Engine – a deterministic global optimization MINLP solver. Plans exist for additional features.
- OptimJ – Java-based modelling language. Premium Edition includes support for Mosek and CPLEX solvers.
- Optimus platform – a process integration and design optimization platform developed by Noesis Solutions.
- optiSLang – software for CAE-based sensitivity analysis, optimization, and robustness evaluation.
- OptiStruct – CAE technology for conceptual design synthesis and structural optimization.
- OptQuest – metaheuristics-based optimization plugin for simulation-based optimization in conjunction with discrete-event simulation software.
- PottersWheel – parameter estimation in ordinary differential equations (MATLAB toolbox, free for academic use).
- SAS – a software suite developed by SAS Institute for advanced analytics (statistics, forecasting, machine learning, optimization, etc.), business intelligence, customer intelligence, data management, risk management, and many more.
- SmartDO – multidisciplinary global design optimization, specialized in computer-aided engineering (CAE). using the direct global search approaches.
- SNOPT – large-scale optimization problems.
- The Unscrambler – product formulation and process optimization software.
- TOMLAB – supports global optimization, integer programming, all types of least squares, linear, quadratic, and unconstrained programming for MATLAB. TOMLAB supports solvers like CPLEX, SNOPT, KNITRO and MIDACO.
- VisSim – a visual block diagram language for simulation and optimization of dynamical systems.
- WORHP – a large-scale sparse solver for continuous nonlinear optimization.

== Freeware/free for academic use ==
- AIMMS
- AMPL
- APMonitor – free for academic and commercial use alike, with Python and MATLAB integrations.
- ASTOS
- CPLEX
- Couenne – An open source solver for the deterministic global optimization of MINLPs licensed under the Eclipse Public License.
- FICO Xpress
- Galahad library
- Gekko
- Gurobi Optimizer - free for academic users
- LIONsolver
- MIDACO – a software package for numerical optimization based on evolutionary computing.
- MINTO – integer programming solver using branch and bound algorithm; freeware for personal use.
- MOSEK – a large scale optimization software. Solves linear, quadratic, conic and convex nonlinear, continuous and integer optimization.
- OptimJ – Java-based modelling language; the free edition includes support for lp_solve, GLPK and LP or MPS file formats.
- PottersWheel – parameter estimation in ordinary differential equations (free MATLAB toolbox for academic use).
- Pyomo – collection of Python software packages for formulating optimization models.
- WORHP

== See also ==
- Comparison of optimization software
- List of computer algebra systems
- List of constraint programming languages
- List of numerical libraries
- List of optimization algorithms
- List of SMT solvers
