= SmartDO =

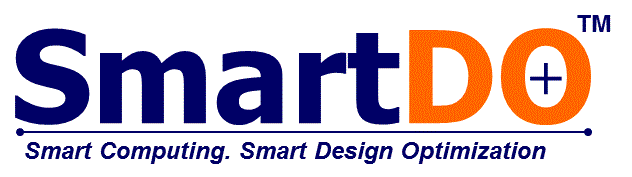
- Developer: FEA-Opt Technology
- Initial release: 2006; 20 years ago
- Stable release: 5.0.4 / June 2013; 12 years ago
- Operating system: MS Windows
- Type: Technical computing
- License: Proprietary
- Website: www.smartdo.co

SmartDO is a multidisciplinary design optimization software, based on the Direct Global Search technology developed and marketed by FEA-Opt Technology. SmartDO specialized in the CAE-Based optimization, such as CAE (computer-aided engineering), FEA (finite element analysis), CAD (computer-aided design), CFD (Computational fluid dynamics) and automatic control, with application on various physics phenomena. It is both GUI and scripting driven, allowed to be integrated with almost any kind of CAD/CAE and in-house codes.

SmartDO focuses on the direct global optimization solver, which does not need much parametric study and tweaking on the solver parameter. Because of this, SmartDO has been frequently customized as the push-button expert system.

== History ==
SmartDO was originated in 1995 by its founder (Dr. Shen-Yeh Chen) during his Ph.D. study in Civil Engineering Department of Arizona State University. During 1998 to 2004, SmartDO was continuously developed and applied on aerospace industry and CAE consulting application as an in-house code. In 2005, Dr. Chen established FEA-Opt Technology as a CAE consulting firm and software vendor. The first commercialized version 1.0 was published in 2006 by FEA-Opt Technology. In 2012, FEA-Opt Technology signed partner agreement with both ANSYS and MSC Software base on SmartDO.

== Process integration ==
SmartDO uses both GUI and scripting-based interface to integrate with the 3rd party software. The GUI includes general operation of SmartDO and package specific linking interface, called the SmartLink. Smartlink can link with 3rd party CAE software, such as ANSYS Workbench. The user can cross-link any parameters in ANSYS Workbench to any design parameters in SmartDO, such as design variables, objective function, and constraints, and SmartDO will usually solve the problem well with the default settings.

The scripting interface in SmartDO is based on Tcl/Tk shell. This makes SmartDO able to link with almost any kind of 3rd party software and in-house code. SmartDO comes with the SmartScripting GUI, for generating Tcl/Tk script automatically. The user can create script by answering questions in the SmartScripting GUI, and SmartScripting will generate Tcl/Tk scripts for the user. The flexible scripting interface allows SmartDO to be customized as a push-button automatic design system.

== Design optimization ==
SmartDO uses the Direct Global Search methodology to achieve global optimization, including both Gradient-Based Nonlinear programming and Genetic Algorithm based stochastic programming. These two approaches can also be combined or mixed to solve specific problems.

For all the solvers in SmartDO, there is no theoretical and/or coding restriction on the number of design variables and/or constraints. SmartDO can start from an infeasible design point, pushing the design into the feasible domain first, and then proceed with optimization.

=== Gradient-Based Nonlinear Programming ===
SmartDO uses the Generalized Reduced Gradient Method and the Method of Feasible Directions as its foundation to solve the constrained nonlinear programming problem. To achieve global search capability, SmartDO also uses Tunneling and Hill climbing to escape from the local minimum. This also enables SmartDO to eliminate the numerical noise caused by meshing, discretization, and other phenomena during numerical analysis. Other unique technologies include

- Automatic recognition of active constraints.
- Smart Dynamic Search to automatically adjust search direction and step size.

=== Genetic Algorithm ===
The Genetic Algorithm in SmartDO was part of the founder's Ph.D. dissertation, which is called the Robust Genetic Algorithms. It includes some special approaches to achieve stability and efficiency, for example,

- Adaptive Penalty Function.
- Automatic Schema Representation.
- Automatic Population and Generation Number Calculation.
- Adaptive and Automatic Cross-Over Probability Calculation.
- Absolute Descent.

Because there are various types of design variables available in the Robust Genetic Algorithms, the users can perform Concurrent Sizing, Shaping and Topology Optimization with SmartDO.

== Applications ==
SmartDO has been widely applied on the industry design and control since 1995. The disciplines and physics phenomena includes

- Structure
- CFD
- Heat Flow
- Heat Transfer
- Crashworthiness
- Structural/Thermal/Electronic Coupled
- Automatic Control

And the application includes

- Life prolonging of semi-conductor component.
- Keratotomy Surgeries.
- Civil structure and resident roof optimization (sizing, shaping and topology).
- Life prolonging and weight reduction for the components of gas turbine engines.
- Enhancement for the performance of the fluid power system.
- Weight reduction and strength increase of the nuclear heavy-duty lifting hook.
- Performance optimization of the shock absorbing mechanism.
- Weight reduction of the air cargo deck.
- Performance optimization of the thermoelectric generator.
- Weight reduction of the lower A-Arm of the armored tank.
- Performance curve optimization for the keyboard rubber dome.
- Performance curve optimization for the connectors.
- Composite structure optimization.
- Strength optimization of the circulation water pump in power plant.
- Structural optimization for the wave energy converter.
- Performance optimization of the jet nozzle.
- Optimization of the O-Ring Sealing for the steel charger.
- Performance Enhancement of the Golf Club Head.
- Crashworthiness Optimization of The Crash Box.
- Ceramic Gas Turbine Engines Rotor Disk Structural Optimization.
