= List of MATLAB software and tools =

List of software related to the MATLAB programming language

This is a list of MATLAB software and tools, including development environments, model-based design tools, code generation software, testing utilities, deployment platforms, and related numerical computing environments.

== Core environments and editors ==
- MATLAB — numerical computing environment
- MATLAB Online — web-based environment
- Simulink — model-based design environment
- App Designer — graphical app development tool
- Live Editor — interactive notebook-style editor

== Model-based design and simulation ==
- Stateflow — state machine design tool
- Simscape — physical system modelling environment
- SimEvents — discrete-event simulation tool
- SimBiology — biological system modelling environment

== Code generation and deployment ==
- MATLAB Compiler — standalone application builder
- MATLAB Compiler SDK — component packaging tool
- MATLAB Coder — C and C++ code generator
- Simulink Coder — code generation from models
- Embedded Coder — embedded systems code generator
- HDL Coder — hardware description language code generator
- Simulink PLC Coder — PLC structured text generator
- MATLAB Web App Server — web app hosting platform
- MATLAB Production Server — analytics deployment server

== Testing, verification and analysis ==
- MATLAB Test — unit testing framework
- Simulink Test — model testing framework
- Simulink Coverage — coverage analysis tool
- Polyspace — static analysis and verification tools
- Simulink Check — modelling standards checker

== Reporting and education ==
- MATLAB Report Generator — automated reporting tool
- Simulink Report Generator — model reporting tool
- MATLAB Grader — programming assessment platform

== Toolboxes and add-ons ==
- Image Processing Toolbox
- Signal Processing Toolbox
- Control System Toolbox
- Optimization Toolbox
- Statistics and Machine Learning Toolbox
- Parallel Computing Toolbox

== Related free and open-source software ==
- GNU Octave — MATLAB-compatible numerical computing environment
- Scilab — numerical computing environment with similar syntax

== MATLAB with other programming languages ==
=== C mathematical libraries ===
- GNU Scientific Library
- Fastest Fourier Transform in the West
- PETSc

=== C++ mathematical libraries ===
- Eigen
- Armadillo
- ALGLIB

=== Fortran mathematical libraries ===
- BLAS
- LAPACK
- SLATEC

=== Python libraries ===
- NumPy
- SciPy
- pandas
- Matplotlib
- TensorFlow
- PyTorch

== See also ==
- List of mathematical software
- List of open-source software for mathematics
- List of optimization software
- List of public domain mathematical and scientific libraries
- List of numerical analysis software
- Lists of programming software development tools
- MATLAB syntax
