= Comparison of optimization software =

Given a system transforming a set of inputs to output values, described by a mathematical function f, optimization refers to the generation and selection of the best solution from some set of available alternatives, by systematically choosing input values from within an allowed set, computing the value of the function, and recording the best value found during the process. Many real-world and theoretical problems may be modeled in this general framework. For example, the inputs can be design parameters of a motor while the output can be the power consumption. Other inputs can be business choices with the output being obtained profit. or describing the configuration of a physical system with the output being its energy.

An optimization problem can be represented in the following way

Given: a function f : A $\to$ R from some set A to the real numbers
Search for: an element x_{0} in A such that f(x_{0}) ≤ f(x) for all x in A ("minimization").

Typically, A is some subset of the Euclidean space R^{n}, often specified by a set of constraints, equalities or inequalities that the members of A have to satisfy. Maximization can be reduced to minimization by multiplying the function by minus one.

The use of optimization software requires that the function f is defined in a suitable programming language and linked to the optimization software. The optimization software will deliver input values in A, the software module realizing f will deliver the computed value f(x). In this manner, a clear separation of concerns is obtained: different optimization software modules can be easily tested on the same function f, or a given optimization software can be used for different functions f.

The following tables provide a comparison of notable optimization software libraries, either specialized or general purpose libraries with significant optimization coverage.

Name	Programming language	Latest stable version	Academic/noncommercial use is free	Can be used in proprietary apps	License	Notes
ALGLIB	C++, C#, Python, FreePascal	3.19.0 / June 2022	Yes	Yes	Dual (Commercial, GPL)	General purpose library, includes optimization package: linear, quadratic, nonlinear programming.
AMPL	C, C++, C#, Python, Java, Matlab, R	October 2018	Yes	Yes	Dual (Commercial, academic)	A popular algebraic modeling language for linear, mixed-integer and nonlinear optimization. Student and AMPL for courses versions are available for free.
APMonitor	Fortran, C++, Python, Matlab, Julia	0.6.2 / March 2016	Yes	Yes	Dual (Commercial, academic)	A differential and algebraic modeling language for mixed-integer and nonlinear optimization. Freely available interfaces for Matlab, Python, and Julia.
Artelys Knitro	C, C++, C#, Python, Java, Julia, Matlab, R	11.1 / November 2018	No	Yes	Commercial, Academic, Trial	General purpose library, specialized in nonlinear optimization. Handles mixed-integer problems (MINLP) and mathematical programs with equilibrium constraints (MPEC). Specialized algorithms for nonlinear least squares problems.
CPLEX	C, C++, Java, C#, Python, R	20.1 / Dec 2020	Yes	Yes	Commercial, academic, trial	IBM CPLEX Optimization Studio is a suite of optimization engines (CPLEX for Mathematical Programming, and CP Optimizer for Constraint programming), a modeling language (OPL), and an Integrated Development Environment.
FICO Xpress	Mosel, BCL, C, C++, Java, R, Python, Matlab, .Net, VB6	8.13 / Nov 2021	Yes	Yes	Commercial, academic, community, trial	Suite of Optimization Technologies and Solutions. Includes: Solver technologies including (LP (Simplex & Barrier), MIP, MIQP, MIQCQP, MISOCP, MINLP QP, QCQP, SOCP, NLP (SLP & Interior Point); An algebraic modelling and procedural programming language; an Integrated Development Environment; Supports for a range of execution services; Support for packaging of optimization models and services as software solutions
GEKKO	Python	0.2.8 / August 2020	Yes	Yes	Dual (Commercial, academic)	GEKKO is a Python package for machine learning and optimization of mixed-integer and differential algebraic equations. It is coupled with large-scale solvers for linear, quadratic, nonlinear, and mixed integer programming (LP, QP, NLP, MILP, MINLP). Modes of operation include parameter regression, data reconciliation, real-time optimization, dynamic simulation, and nonlinear predictive control.
GNU Linear Programming Kit	C	4.52 / July 2013	Yes	No	GPL	Free library for linear programming (LP) and mixed integer programming (MIP).
GNU Scientific Library	C	1.16 / July 2013	Yes	No	GPL	Free library provided by GNU project.
IMSL Numerical Libraries	C, Java, C#, Fortran, Python	many components	No	Yes	Proprietary	
LIONsolver	C++, Java	2.0.198 / October 2011	Yes	Yes	Proprietary	Support for interactive and learning optimization, according to RSO principles .
Math Kernel Library (MKL)	C++, Fortran	11.1 / October 2013	No	Yes	Proprietary	Numerical library from Intel. MKL is specialized on linear algebra, but contains some optimization-related functionality.
Wolfram Mathematica	C++, Wolfram Language	14.2.0 (January 23, 2025; 53 days ago) [±]	No	Yes	Proprietary	Constrained nonlinear optimization, interior point methods, convex optimization and integer programming-as well as original symbolic methods integrated with general computational capabilities.
MIDACO	C++, C#, Python, Matlab, Octave, Fortran, R, Java, Excel, VBA, Julia	6.0 / Mar 2018	Yes	Yes	Dual (Commercial, academic)	Lightweight software tool for single- and multi-objective optimization. Supporting MINLP and parallelization.
NAG Numerical Libraries	C, Fortran	Mark 26 / October 2017	No	Yes	Proprietary	
NMath	C#	5.3 / May 2013	No	Yes	Proprietary	C# numerical library built on top of MKL.
Octeract Engine	C++/Python	0.11.29 / November 2019	No	Yes	Commercial	Supercomputing deterministic global optimization solver for general MINLP problems. Octeract Engine uses MPI for distributed calculations.
OptaPlanner	Java	8.0.0.Final / November 2020	Yes	Yes	ASL (open source)	Lightweight optimization solver in Java, with optional integration modules for JPA-Hibernate, Quarkus, Spring, Jackson, JAXB, etc. Works on Kotlin and Scala too.
SciPy	Python	0.13.1 / November 2013	Yes	Yes	BSD	General purpose numerical and scientific computing library for Python.

== See also ==
- List of optimization software
