= TOMNET =

- Developer: Tomlab Optimization Inc.
- Stable release: 1.1 / 20 September 2007
- Written in: C++, C# and more
- Operating system: Windows 32-bit
- Size: 10 MB (Windows)
- Type: Technical computing
- License: Proprietary
- Website: TOMNET product page

The TOMNET optimization Environment is a platform for solving applied optimization problems in Microsoft .NET. It makes it possible to use solvers like SNOPT, MINOS and CPLEX with one single model formulation. The solvers handle everything from linear programming and integer programming to global optimization.
