= Scientific programming =

Scientific programming may refer to:

- Scientific programming language, a family of programming languages
- Scientific Programming, an academic journal
