= OpenMDAO =

- Developer: NASA Glenn Research Center
- Stable release: 3.41.0
- Operating system: Cross-platform
- Type: Technical computing
- License: Apache License 2.0
- Website: openmdao.org

OpenMDAO is an open-source high-performance computing platform for systems analysis and multidisciplinary optimization written in the Python programming language.

The OpenMDAO project is primarily focused on supporting gradient based optimization with analytic derivatives to allow you to explore large design spaces with hundreds or thousands of design variables, but the framework also has a number of parallel computing features that can work with gradient-free optimization, mixed-integer nonlinear programming, and traditional design space exploration.

The OpenMDAO framework is designed to aid in linking together separate pieces of software for the purpose of combined analyses. It allows users to combine analysis tools (or design codes) from multiple disciplines, at multiple levels of fidelity, and to manage the interaction between them. OpenMDAO is specifically designed to manage the dataflow (the actual data) and the workflow (what code is run when) in conjunction with optimization algorithms and other advanced solution techniques.

The development of OpenMDAO is led out of the NASA Glenn Research Center.

== Features ==
- Library of built-in solvers and optimizers
- Tools for metamodeling
- Data recording capabilities
- Support for analytic derivatives
- Support for high-performance computer clusters and distributed computing
- Extensible plugin library

== Applications ==
NASA’s motivation in supporting the OpenMDAO project stems from the demands of unconventional aircraft concepts like Turbo-Electric distributed propulsion. Although NASA’s focus is on analyzing aerospace applications, the framework itself is general and is not specific to any discipline.

== Framework structure ==
OpenMDAO is designed to separate the flow of information (dataflow) from the process in which analyses are executed (workflow). It does that by using four specific constructs: Component, Assembly, Driver, and Workflow.

The construction of system models begins with wrapping (or writing from scratch) various analysis codes as Components. A group of components is linked together inside an Assembly, specifying the dataflow between them. Once the dataflow is in place, one can select specific Drivers (optimizers, solvers, design of experiments, etc.) and set up a Workflow to determine exactly how the problem should be solved.

OpenMDAO also includes a web-browser-based graphical user interface (GUI) for visual construction, execution, and optimization of models.

== See also ==
- ModelCenter
- Simulink
- Multidisciplinary design optimization
