= ACSYNT Institute =

1990s aircraft design software project

- Mission statement: Develop software for aircraft design portable across all platforms for use in NASA aeronautics missions and as the basis for an industry standard to improve computer-aided aircraft design
- Type of project: Aircraft design software development project
- Products: Aircraft design software, user interfaces, data exchange interfaces, user support systems, industry standards guidelines
- Location: Virginia Polytechnic Institute (VPI)
- Owner: NASA Ames Research Center, Systems Analysis Branch
- Key people: Paul Gelhausen, NASA Ames Research Center; Arvid Myklebust, Virginia Polytechnic Institute; Syed Shariq, American Technology Initiative (AmTech)
- Established: 1990
- Closed: 1995

The ACSYNT Institute was an innovation public-private partnership between NASA, eight aircraft companies and eight universities. Its goal was to develop computer-aided aircraft design software for multiple computational platforms. The Institute was managed by Virginia Tech's CAD Laboratory in Blacksburg, Virginia and expanded on the NASA Ames Research Center's AirCraft SYNThesis (ACSYNT) software, originally developed for NASA aeronautics missions.

Operating from 1990 to 1995 as a partnership project of NASA's Joint Sponsored Research Program (JSRP), the initiative shared costs and intellectual property among partners. The resulting software became an industry standard for aircraft design and was recognized as a commercialization success by the American Institute of Aeronautics and Astronautics (AIAA).

== Purpose and objectives ==
The ACSYNT Institute was established to:

- Facilitate NASA-sponsored collaboration with Virginia Tech (VPI) and partner organizations to develop the ACSYNT aircraft design software.
- Advance NASA's aeronautical R&D by supporting computer-aided aircraft design technologies.
- Improve R&D efficiency through shared resources and expertise, addressing the needs of government, industry, and academia.
- Strengthen U.S. competitiveness by transferring ACSYNT software to industry and academia while supporting its commercialization.

The Institute's five-year R&D plan included key objectives:

- Annual releases of updated ACSYNT software for research, testing, and development.
- At least one maintenance update per year.
- Yearly research reports documenting progress and developments.

== Membership ==
The Institute expanded from six founding members to 22 participants by 1995, categorized as follows:

=== Federal Government ===
- NASA: Ames, Lewis, and Langley Research Centers
- U.S. DOD: Naval Weapons Center, Naval Postgraduate School, Air Force Academy

=== State Government ===
- State of Virginia (Center for Innovative Technology, C.I.T.)

=== Commercial ===
- Boeing Commercial Airplane
- Boeing Helicopter
- Cessna
- Defense Group Inc.
- General Electric Aircraft Engine
- Lockheed
- McDonnell Douglas
- Northrop

=== Research management ===
- Virginia Tech (VPI)

=== Academic ===
- Arizona State University
- California Polytechnic, Pomona
- California Polytechnic, San Luis Obispo
- Georgia Technology
- Mississippi State University
- University of Illinois
- University of Minnesota
- University of Virginia

== Organization, management and administration ==
The ACSYNT Institute operated as a multi-sponsor research program within Virginia Tech's CAD Laboratory with NASA participating as a public/private partner through a NASA Joint Sponsored Research Project (JSRP). The partnership originated from collaborations beginning in 1987, when NASA initially funded the lab through Cooperative Agreement NAG 2-461. By 1989, four aerospace companies had joined through separate agreements to contribute software code and provide user feedback. These were consolidated into a single partnership agreement in 1990 to resolve administrative conflicts with NASA funding guidelines and establish clear protocols for member contributions, resource sharing, and intellectual property allocation. The program was co-directed by Paul Gelhausen (NASA Ames) and Dr. Arvid Myklebust (Virginia Tech), with partnership administration handled through NASA's JSRP framework using management specialists from American Technology Initiative (AmTech), a non-profit organization specializing in public-private R&D collaborations.

== Public/Private partnership ==
NASA participated in ACSYNT Institute as a Joint Sponsored Research Project organized by the NASA Joint Sponsored Research Program (JSRP), which facilitated public-private R&D partnerships. Under a Joint Sponsored Research Agreement (JSRA), NASA combined resources - including funding, personnel, equipment, and software code - with other participants. This collaboration operated under NASA's funded Space Act Authority, which formally authorized the Agency's involvement in the partnership.

== Research and development plan (1990–1995) ==
The Institute partners collaboratively executed a five-phase development program focused on:

- Geometric Modeling
- Graphical User Interface
- Analysis for Application
- Integration for Utilization
- Support for Ongoing Updates

== Results and commercialization ==
The Institute generated professional-grade, fully interactive, aircraft design software that enabled parametric geometry generation using spreadsheet input formats to drive CAD functionality. The software was portable across multiple platforms. A startup company, Phoenix Integration, was formed from students and participants to maintain and update the software. Phoenix Integration was later acquired by ANSYS in 2019. As of 2025, ANSYS continues to offer successor design software based on the ACSYNT platform.

== Recognition ==
NASA acknowledged the ACSYNT-derived software as both a development and spinoff success in 1997. This followed earlier recognition in 1996 by the American Institute of Aeronautics and Astronautics (AIAA), which highlighted the software's successful commercialization.

== See also ==
- Aircraft design process
- Computer-aided design
- Phoenix Integration
