= OptiSLang =

optiSLang
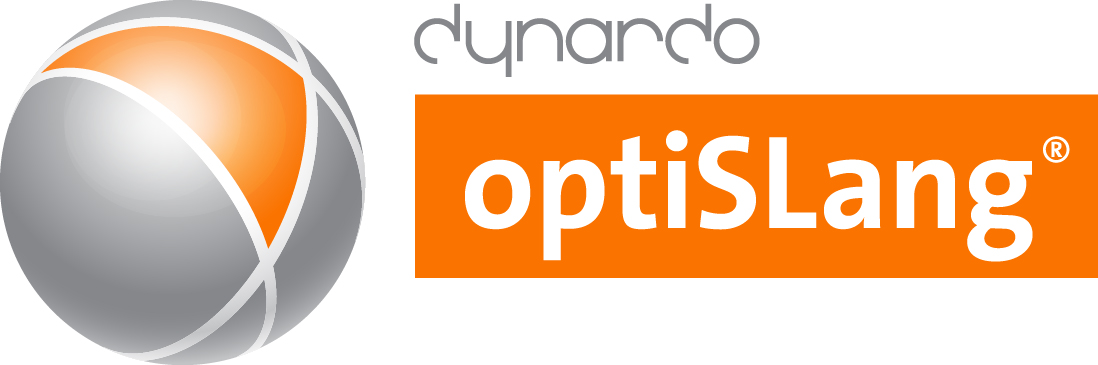

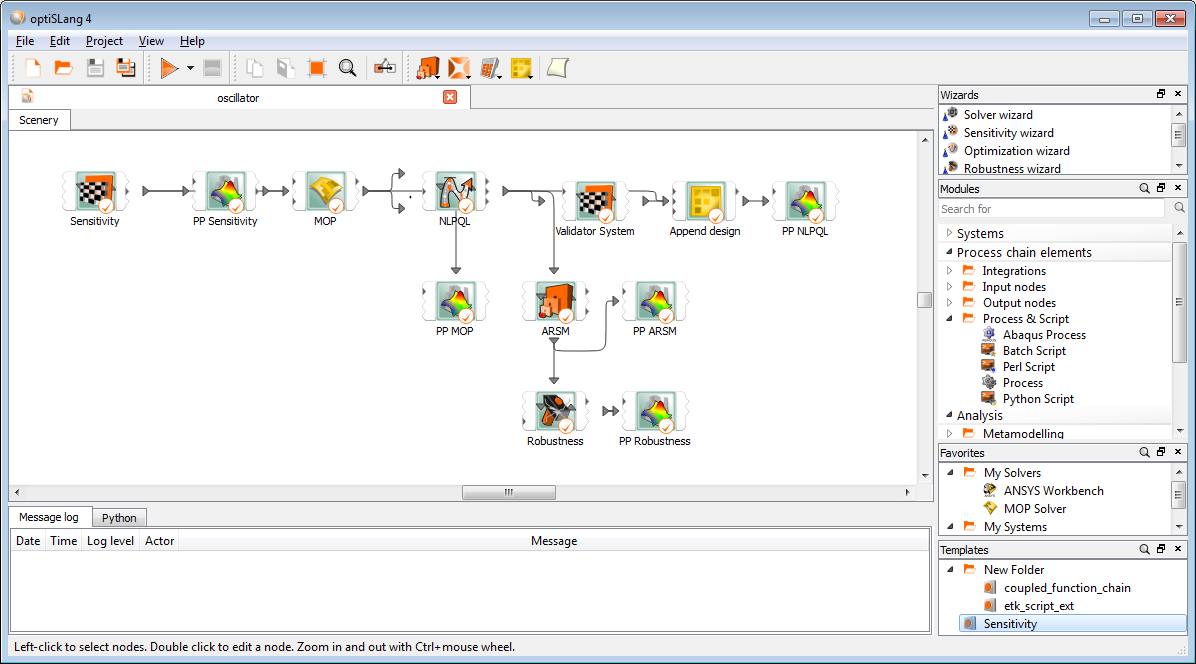
- Developer: Ansys Germany GmbH
- Stable release: 23.2 / June 2023
- Operating system: Cross-platform
- Platform: Intel x86 32-bit, x86-64
- Available in: English
- Type: Simulation software
- License: Proprietary commercial software
- Website: optiSLang product page

optiSLang is a software platform for CAE-based sensitivity analysis, multi-disciplinary optimization (MDO) and robustness evaluation. It was originally developed by Dynardo GmbH and provides a framework for numerical Robust Design Optimization (RDO) and stochastic analysis by identifying variables which contribute most to a predefined optimization goal. This includes also the evaluation of robustness, i.e. the sensitivity towards scatter of design variables or random fluctuations of parameters. In 2019, Dynardo GmbH was acquired by Ansys.

== Methodology ==
=== Sensitivity analysis ===
Representing continuous optimization variables by uniform distributions without variable interactions, variance based sensitivity analysis quantifies the contribution of the optimization variables for a possible improvement of the model responses. In contrast to local derivative based sensitivity methods, the variance based approach quantifies the contribution with respect to the defined variable ranges.

Coefficient of Prognosis (CoP)
The CoP is a model independent measure to assess the model quality and is defined as follows:

$CoP = 1 - \frac{SS_E^{\text{pred}}}{SS_T}$

Where $SS_E^{\text{pred}}$ is the sum of squared prediction errors. These errors are estimated based on cross validation. In the cross validation procedure, the set of support points is mapped to $q$ subsets. Then the approximation model is built by removing subset $i$ from the support points and approximating the subset model output $y_i$ using the remaining point set. This means that the model quality is estimated only at those points which are not used to build the approximation model. Since the prediction error is used instead of the fit, this approach applies to regression and even interpolation models.

Metamodel of Optimal Prognosis (MOP):
The prediction quality of an approximation model may be improved if unimportant variables are removed from the model. This idea is adopted in the Metamodel of Optimal Prognosis (MOP) which is based on the search for the optimal input variable set and the most appropriate approximation model (polynomial or Moving Least Squares with linear or quadratic basis). Due to the model independence and objectivity of the CoP measure, it is well suited to compare the different models in the different subspaces.

Multi-disciplinary optimization:
The optimal variable subspace and approximation model found by a CoP/MOP procedure can also be used for a pre-optimization before global optimizers (evolutionary algorithms, Adaptive Response Surface Methods, Gradient-based methods, biological-based methods) are used for a direct single-objective optimization. After conducting a sensitivity analysis using MOP/CoP, also a multi-objective optimization can be performed to determine the optimization potential within opposing objectives and to derive suitable weighting factors for a following single-objective optimization. Finally this single-objective optimization determines an optimal design.

Robustness evaluation:
In variance-based robustness analysis, the variations of the critical model responses are investigated. In optiSLang, random sampling methods are used to generate discrete samples of the joined probability density function of the given random variables. Based on these samples, which are evaluated by the solver similarly as in the sensitivity analysis, the statistical properties of the model responses as mean value, standard deviation, quantiles and higher order stochastic moments are estimated.

Reliability analysis:
Within the framework of probabilistic safety assessment or reliability analysis, the scattering influences are modelled as random variables, which are defined by distribution type, stochastic moments and mutual correlations. The result of the analysis is the complementary of reliability, the probability of failure, which can be represented on a logarithmic scale.

== Process integration ==
optiSLang is designed to use several solvers to investigate mechanical, mathematical, technical and any other quantifiable problems. Herein optiSLang provides direct interfaces for external programs:

- ANSYS
- MATLAB
- GNU Octave
- Excel
- OpenOffice Calc
- Python
- Abaqus
- SimulationX
- CATIA
- LS-DYNA
- Flownex
- multiPlas
- any software with text-based input definition

== History ==
Since the 1980s, research teams at the University of Innsbruck and Bauhaus-Universität Weimar had been developing algorithms for optimization and reliability analysis in conjunction with finite element simulations. As a result, the software "Structural Language (SLang)" was created. In 2000, CAE engineers first applied it to conducted optimization and robustness analysis in the automotive industry. In 2001, the Dynardo GmbH was founded in 2003. Based on SLang, the software optiSLang was launched as an industrial solution for CAE-based sensitivity analysis, optimization, robustness evaluation and reliability analysis. In 2013, the current version optiSLang 4 was completely restructured with a new graphical user interface and extended interfaces to external CAE processes.
