= Optimus =

Optimus may refer to:

== Organisations ==
- Optimus Telecomunicações, S.A., a Portuguese mobile phone company
- Optimus S.A., a former Polish computer assembler

== Fictional characters ==
- Optimus Prime, a Transformers character, leader of the Autobots
- Optimus Primal, a Transformers character, leader of the Maximals

== Music ==
- Optimus Rhyme, a nerdcore rap trio
- Optimus (album), by guitarist John Norum

== Technology ==
- Optimus (robot), under development by Tesla, Inc.
- LG Optimus, a smartphone product line
- Nvidia Optimus, a PC graphics management technology
- Optimus UI, a touch interface
- Optimus Maximus keyboard
- Optimus brand, a RadioShack audio/video product line
- Optimus platform, process integration and design optimization software

== See also ==
- Jupiter (mythology), or Jupiter Optimus Maximus, a Roman deity
  - Jupiter Optimus Maximus, a temple honoring Jupiter
