= Optimus platform =

Optimus
- Developer(s): Noesis Solutions
- Stable release: 2022.1 / April 2022
- Operating system: Cross-platform
- Type: Technical computing
- License: Proprietary

Optimus is a Process Integration and Design Optimization (PIDO) platform developed by Noesis Solutions. Noesis Solutions takes part in key research projects, such as PHAROS and MATRIX.

Optimus allows the integration of multiple engineering software tools (CAD, Multibody dynamics, finite elements, computational fluid dynamics, ...) into a single and automated workflow. Once a simulation process is captured in a workflow, Optimus will direct the simulations to explore the design space and to optimize product designs for improved functional performance and lower cost, while also minimizing the time required for the overall design process.

== Process integration ==
The Optimus GUI enables the creation of a graphical simulation workflow. A set of functions supports the integration of both commercial and in-house software. A simple workflow can cover a single simulation program, whereas more advanced workflows can include multiple simulation programs. These workflows may contain multiple branches, each with one or more simulation programs, and may include special statements that define looping and conditional branching.

Optimus’ workflow execution mechanism can range from a step-by-step review of the simulation process up to deployment on a large (and non-heterogeneous) computation cluster. Optimus is integrated with several resource management systems to support parallel execution on a computational cluster.

== Design optimization ==
Optimus includes a wide range of methods and models to help solve design optimization problems:

- Design of Experiments (DOE)
- Response Surface Modeling (RSM)
- Numerical optimization, based on local or global algorithms, both for single or multiple objectives with continuous and/or discrete design variables

=== Design of Experiments (DOE) ===
Design of Experiments (DOE) defines an optimal set of experiments in the design space in order to obtain the most relevant and accurate design information at minimal cost. Optimus supports the following DOE methods:
* Adaptive DOE (new)
* Full Factorial (2-level & 3-level)
* Adjustable Full Factorial
* Fractional Factorial
* Plackett-Burman
* Space Filling
* Central composite
* Random
* Latin-Hypercube
* Starpoints
* Diagonal
* Optimal design (I-, D- & A-optimal)
* User-defined

=== Response Surface Modeling (RSM) ===
Response Surface Modeling (RSM) is a collection of mathematical and statistical techniques that are useful to model and analyze problems in which a design response of interest is influenced by several design parameters. DOE methods in combination with RSM can predict design response values for combinations of input design parameters that were not previously calculated, with very little simulation effort. RSM thus allows further post-processing of DOE results.

Optimus’ Response Surface Modeling range from classical Least Squares methods to advanced Stochastic Interpolation methods, including Kriging, Neural Network, Radial Basis Functions and Gaussian Process models. To maximize RSM accuracy, Optimus can also generate the best RSM automatically – drawing from a large set of RSM algorithms and optimizing the RSM using a cross-validation approach.

=== Numerical Optimization ===
Optimus supports a wide range of single-objective and multi-objective methods. Multi-objective optimization methods usually generate a so-called „Pareto front“ or use a weighting function to generate a single Pareto point.

Based on the search methods, Optimus optimization methods (both single and multi-objective) can be categorized into:

- local optimization methods - searching for an optimum based on local information of the optimization problem (such as gradient information). Methods include

* SQP (Sequential Quadratic Programming)
* NLPQL
* Generalized Reduced Gradient
* NBI, weighted methods (multi-objective)

- global optimization methods - searching for the optimum based on global information of the optimization problem. These are usually probability-based searching methods. Methods include

* Genetic algorithms (Differential Evolution, Self-adaptive Evolution, ...)
* Simulated Annealing
* CMA-ES
* NSEA+, mPSO (multi-objective)

- hybrid optimization methods, e.g. Efficient Global Optimization, combining the local and the global approach into one approach which usually relies on response surface modeling to find a global optimum.
- an Automatic optimisation method is also available. That would automatically selects the best strategy for the user.
- Partner (eArtius) & open library (Dakota) are integrated into Optimus via this functionality

User can also integrate their own optimization strategy in the Optimus environment.

== Robust design optimization & Taguchi method ==
In order to assess the influence of real-world uncertainties and tolerances on a given design, Optimus contains Monte Carlo Simulation as well as a First-Order Second Moment method to estimate and improve the robustness of a design. Optimus calculates and optimizes the probability of failure using advanced reliability methods, including First-Order and Second-Order Reliability Methods.

Optimus also includes a dedicated set of functionalities to set up a Taguchi study through the definition of control factors, noise factors and signal factors in case of a dynamic study. Genichi Taguchi, a Japanese engineer, published his first book on experimental design in 1958. The aim of the Taguchi design is to make a product or process more stable in the face of variations over which there is little or no control (for example, ensuring reliable performance of a car engine for different ambient temperatures).

== Applications ==
The use of Optimus covers a wide range of applications, including

- optimization of the production process of a center wing box (CWB) factory in function of production rate variations
- identification of the best possible design trade-off between ease of swallowing and durability, based on finite element based analysis of food supplement tablet hardness and punch strength simulations
- engineering of a hybrid electric vehicle (HEV) prototype for fuel economy
