= Galahad library =

Computing library

The Galahad library is a thread-safe library of packages for the solution of mathematical optimization problems. The areas covered by the library are unconstrained and bound-constrained optimization, quadratic programming, nonlinear programming, systems of nonlinear equations and inequalities, and non-linear least squares problems. The library is mostly written in the Fortran 90 programming language.

The GALAHAD Library is authored and maintained by N.I.M. Gould, D. Orban and Ph.L. Toint.

== Name ==
The name of the library originates from its major package for general nonlinear programming, LANCELOT-B, the successor of the original augmented Lagrangian package LANCELOT of Conn, Gould and Toint.

== Offered packages ==
Other packages in the library include:

- a filter-based method for systems of linear and nonlinear equations and inequalities,
- an active-set method for nonconvex quadratic programming,
- a primal-dual interior-point method for nonconvex quadratic programming,
- a presolver for quadratic programs,
- a Lanczos method for trust-region subproblems,
- an interior-point method to solve linear programs or separable convex programs or alternatively, to compute the analytic center of a set defined by such constraints, if it exists.

Packages in the GALAHAD library accept problems modeled in either the Standard Input Format (SIF), or the AMPL modeling language. For problems modeled in the SIF, the GALAHAD library naturally relies upon the CUTEr package, an optimization toolbox providing all low-level functionalities required by solvers.

== Availability ==
The library is available on several popular computing platforms, including Compaq (DEC) Alpha, Cray, HP, IBM RS/6000, Intel-like PCs, SGI and Sun. It is designed to be easily adapted to other platforms. Support is provided for many operating systems, including Tru64, Linux, HP-UX, AIX, IRIX and Solaris, and for a variety of popular Fortran 90 compilers on these platforms and operating systems.
