= Optimization Toolbox =

- Developer(s): MathWorks
- Stable release: R2018a / March 16, 2018
- Operating system: Cross-platform
- Type: List of optimization software
- License: Proprietary
- Website: Optimization Toolbox

Optimization Toolbox is an optimization software package developed by MathWorks. It is an add-on product to MATLAB, and provides a library of solvers that can be used from the MATLAB environment. The toolbox was first released for MATLAB in 1990.

== Optimization algorithms ==
Optimization Toolbox has algorithms for:

- Linear programming
- Mixed-integer linear programming
- Quadratic programming
- Nonlinear programming
- Linear least squares
- Nonlinear least squares
- Nonlinear equation solving
- Multi-objective optimization

== Applications ==
=== Engineering Optimization ===
Optimization Toolbox solvers are used for engineering applications in MATLAB, such as optimal control and optimal mechanical designs.

=== Parameter Estimation ===
Optimization can help with fitting a model to data, where the goal is to identify the model parameters that minimize the difference between simulated and experimental data. Common parameter estimation problems that are solved with Optimization Toolbox include estimating material parameters and estimating coefficients of ordinary differential equations.

=== Computational Finance ===
Portfolio optimization, cashflow matching, and other computational finance problems are solved with Optimization Toolbox.

=== Utilities and Energy ===
Optimization Toolbox solvers are used for security constrained optimal power flow and power systems analysis.

== See also ==
- Mathematical optimization
