= Ansys =

American technology company

Ansys, Inc.

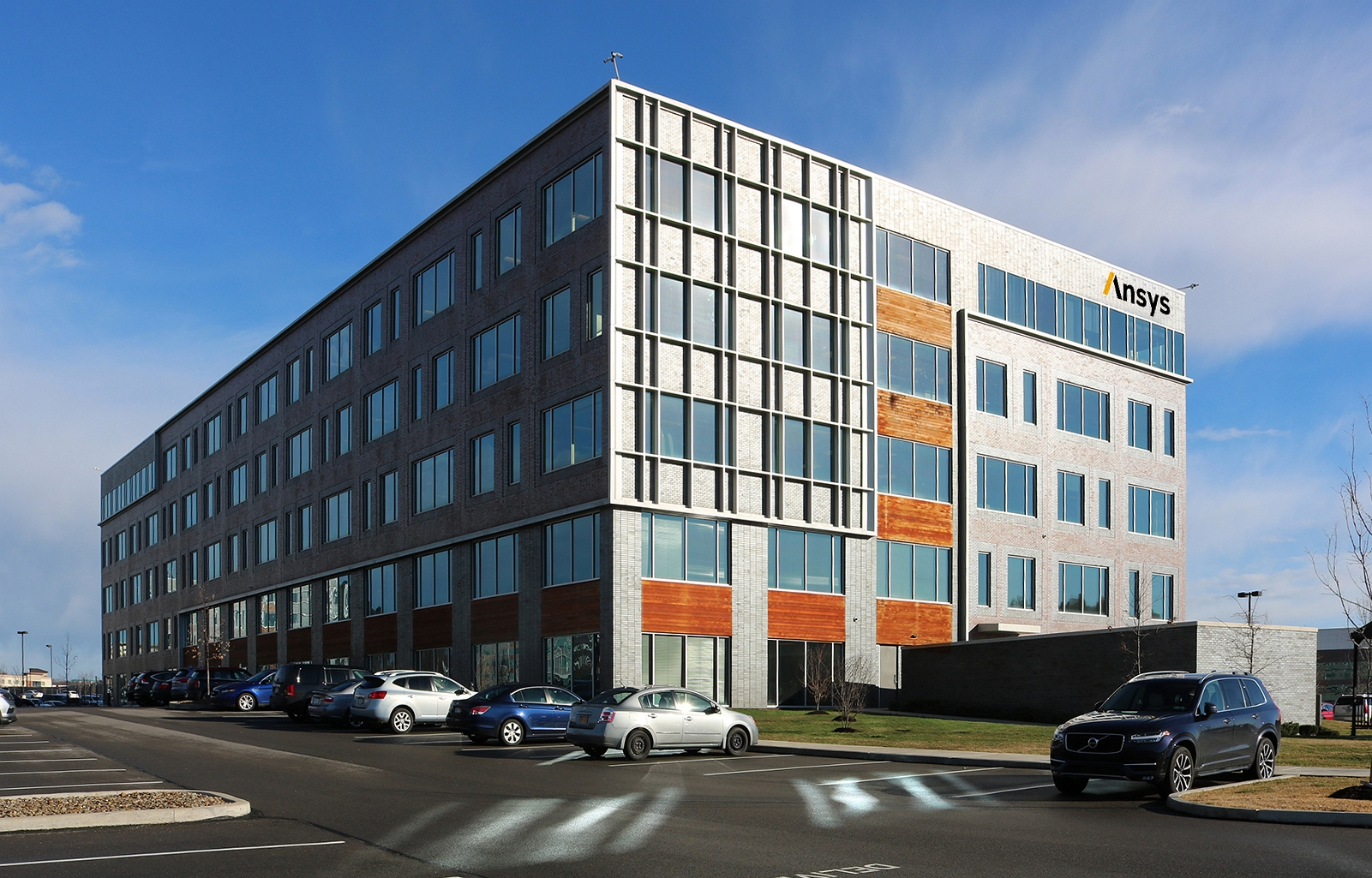
- Headquarters in Canonsburg, Pennsylvania
- Type: Subsidiary
- Traded as: Nasdaq: ANSS (1996–2025)
- Industry: Computer software
- Founded: 1970; 56 years ago, in Canonsburg, Pennsylvania, United States
- Headquarters: Canonsburg, Pennsylvania, U.S.
- Key people: Ronald Hovsepian (chairman); Ajei S. Gopal (president & CEO)
- Products: Ansys suite of engineering simulation software
- Revenue: ▲US$2.54 billion (2024)
- Operating income: ▲US$718 million (2024)
- Net income: ▲US$576 million (2024)
- Total assets: ▲US$8.05 billion (2024)
- Total equity: ▲US$6.09 billion (2024)
- Number of employees: 6,500 (2024)
- Parent: Synopsys
- Website: ansys.com

Ansys, Inc. is an American multinational company with its headquarters based in Canonsburg, Pennsylvania. It develops and markets CAE/multiphysics engineering simulation software for product design, testing and operation and offers its products and services to customers worldwide. On July 17, 2025, the company became a subsidiary of Synopsys.

== History ==
=== Origins ===
Ansys was founded in 1970 as Swanson Analysis Systems, Inc. (SASI) by John Swanson. The idea for Ansys was first conceived by Swanson while working at the Westinghouse Astronuclear Laboratory in the 1960s. At the time, engineers performed finite element analysis (FEA) by hand. Westinghouse rejected Swanson's idea to automate FEA by developing general purpose engineering software, so Swanson left the company in 1969 to develop the software on his own. He founded SASI the next year, working out of his farmhouse in Pittsburgh.

Swanson developed the initial ANSYS software on punch cards and used a mainframe computer that was rented by the hour. Westinghouse hired him as a consultant, under the condition that any code he developed for Westinghouse could also be included in the Ansys product line. Westinghouse became the first Ansys user.

Swanson sold his interest in the company to venture capitalists in 1994, and the company was renamed "Ansys" after the software. Ansys went public on NASDAQ in 1996. In the 2000s, the company acquired other engineering design companies, obtaining additional technology for fluid dynamics, electronics design, and physics analysis. Ansys became a component of the NASDAQ-100 index on December 23, 2019.

=== Growth ===
By 1991, SASI had 153 employees and $29 million in annual revenue, controlling 10 percent of the market for finite element analysis software. According to The Engineering Design Revolution, the company became "well-respected" among engineering circles, but remained small. In 1992, SASI acquired Compuflo, which marketed and developed fluid dynamics analysis software. In 1994, Swanson sold his majority interest in the company to venture capitalist firm TA Associates. Peter Smith was appointed CEO and SASI was renamed after the software, Ansys, the following year.

Ansys went public in 1996, raising about $46 million in an initial public offering. By 1997, Ansys had grown to $50.5 million in annual revenue. In the late 1990s, Ansys shifted its business model away from software licenses, and corresponding revenue declined. However, revenue from services increased. From 1996 to 2000, profits at Ansys grew an average of 160% per year. In February 2000, Jim Cashman was appointed CEO.

Current CEO Ajei S. Gopal was appointed in early 2017. In November 2020, South China Morning Post reported that Ansys software had been used for Chinese military research in the development of hypersonic missile technology. In October 2022, Washington Post reviewed procurement documents and confirmed that Ansys technology had been acquired by seven Chinese entities present on either the export blacklist or with known links to Chinese missile technology. Ansys said that it and its subsidiaries have no records of the indicated sales or shipments and suggested that piracy may have been involved. In January 2024 Synopsys and Ansys announced a definitive agreement under which Synopsys would acquire Ansys in a deal valued at around $35 billion. The acquisition was completed on July 17, 2025.

== List of acquisitions ==
Year announced	Company	Business	Value (USD)	References
1999	Centric Engineering Systems	Fluid, structural, and thermal analysis	Not disclosed	
2000	ICEM CFD Engineering	Mesh simulations	12.4 M	
2001	Cadoe	Computer-aided design	Not disclosed	
2003	CFX	Fluid dynamics simulation	Not disclosed	
2005	Century Dynamics	Hydrodynamics simulation tools	5 M	
2005	Harvard Thermal Inc.	Simulating cooling and temperature in electronics	Not disclosed	
2006	Fluent Inc.	Fluid dynamics tools	299 M	
2008	Ansoft Corporation	Electronics design	823.8 M	
2011	Apache Design Solutions	Semiconductor simulation	310 M	
2012	Esterel Technologies	Simulating interactions between software and hardware	53 M	
2013	EVEN (Evolutionary Engineering)	Cloud-based software for engineering composites	Not disclosed	
2014	Reaction Design	Chemistry and combustion simulation	19.25 M	
2014	SpaceClaim	3D modeling	85 M	
2015	Gear Design Solutions (2015)	Analytics software	Not disclosed	
2015	Delcross Technologies	Systems analysis	Not disclosed	
2015	Newmerical Technologies International Inc.	In-flight icing simulation	Not disclosed	
2016	KPIT medini Technologies AG	Automotive design	Not disclosed	
2017	CLK Design Automation	Transistor-level simulation for semiconductor IP and system-on-chip (SoC) designs	Not disclosed	
2017	Computational Engineering International, Inc. (CEI)	Advanced post-processing and visualization	Not disclosed	
2017	3DSIM	3D printing simulation	Not disclosed	
2018	OPTIS	Optical simulations	Not disclosed	
2019	Helic	Electromagnetic crosstalk simulation	Not disclosed	
2019	Granta Design	Material intelligence	Not disclosed	
2019	DfR Solutions	Reliability physics-based electronics design tool for accurate life predictions of electronic hardware	Not disclosed	
2019	LSTC	Advanced multiphysics simulation	775 M	
2019	Dynardo	PIDO technology	Not disclosed	
2020	Nuhertz Technologies	Electronic filter synthesis and simulation	Not disclosed	
2020	Lumerical	Photonic simulation	Not disclosed	
2020	Analytical Graphics Inc.	Aerospace and defense-focused engineering simulation software	700 M	
2021	Phoenix Integration, Inc.	Model-based engineering and model-based systems engineering	Not disclosed	
2021	Zemax	Design and analysis of both imaging and illumination systems	411 M	
2022	Motor Design Limited (MDL)	Electric machine designs	Not disclosed	
2022	OnScale	Web-based UI for access to Ansys' simulation technologies	Not disclosed	
2022	C&R Technologies	Orbital thermal analysis company	Not disclosed	
2023	DYNAmore	Simulation software, distribution and support, mainly for the automotive industry	Not disclosed	
2023	Diakopto	EDA solutions for accelerate integrated circuit (IC) development and resolution of critical issues caused by layout parasitics	Not disclosed	

== Engineering simulation software ==
Ansys develops and markets engineering simulation software for use across the product life cycle. Ansys Mechanical finite element analysis software uses computer models to simulate structures, electronics, or machine components to evaluate the strength, toughness, elasticity, temperature distribution, electromagnetism, fluid flow, and other attributes. Ansys is used to determine how a product will function with different specifications, without building test products or conducting crash tests. For example, Ansys software may simulate how a bridge will hold up after years of traffic, how to best process salmon in a cannery to reduce waste, or how to design a slide that uses less material without sacrificing safety.

Most Ansys simulations are performed using the Ansys Workbench system, which is one of the company's main products. Typically Ansys users break down larger structures into small components that are each modeled and tested individually. A user may start by defining the dimensions of an object, and then adding weight, pressure, temperature and other physical properties. Finally, the Ansys software simulates and analyzes movement, fatigue, fractures, fluid flow, temperature distribution, electromagnetic efficiency and other effects over time.

Ansys also develops software for data management and backup, academic research and teaching. Ansys software is sold on an annual subscription basis.

=== Software history ===
The first commercial version of Ansys software was labeled version 2.0 and released in 1971. At the time, the software was made up of boxes of punch cards, and the program was typically run overnight to get results the following morning. In 1975, non-linear and thermo-electric features were added. The software was exclusively used on mainframes, until version 3.0 (the second release) was introduced for the VAXstation in 1979. Version 3 had a command-line interface.

In 1980, the Apple II version was released, allowing Ansys to convert to a graphical user interface in version 4 later that year. Version 4 of the Ansys software was easier to use and added features to simulate electromagnetism. In 1989, Ansys began working with Compuflo. Compuflo's Flotran fluid dynamics software was integrated into Ansys by version 5, which was released in 1993. Performance improvements in version 5.1 shortened processing time two to four-fold, and was followed by a series of performance improvements to keep pace with advancements in computing. Ansys also began integrating its software with CAD software, such as Autodesk.

In 1996, Ansys released the DesignSpace structural analysis software, the LS-DYNA crash and drop test simulation product, and the Ansys Computational Fluid Dynamics (CFD) simulator. Ansys also added parallel processing support for PCs with multiple processors. The educational product Ansys/ed was introduced in 1998. Version 6.0 of the main Ansys product was released in December 2001. Version 6.0 made large-scale modeling practical for the first time, but many users were frustrated by a new blue user interface. The interface was redone a few months later in 6.1. Version 8.0 introduced the Ansys multi-field solver, which allows users to simulate how multiple physics problems would interact with one another.

Version 8.0 was published in 2005 and introduced Ansys' fluid–structure interaction software, which simulates the effect structures and fluids have on one another. Ansys also released its Probabilistic Design System and DesignXplorer software products, which both deal with probabilities and randomness of physical elements. In 2009 version 12 was released with an overhauled second version of Workbench. Ansys also began increasingly consolidating features into the Workbench software.

Version 15 of Ansys was released in 2014. It added a new features for composites, bolted connections, and better mesh tools. In February 2015, version 16 introduced the AIM physics engine and Electronics Desktop, which is for semiconductor design. The following year, version 17 introduced a new user interface and performance improvement for computing fluid dynamics problems. In January 2017, Ansys released version 18. Version 18 allowed users to collect real-world data from products and then incorporate that data into future simulations. The Ansys Application Builder, which allows engineers to build, use, and sell custom engineering tools, was also introduced with version 18.

Released in January 2020, Ansys R1 2020 updates Ansys' simulation process and data management (SPDM), materials information and electromagnetics product offerings. In early 2020, the Ansys Academic Program surpassed one million student downloads.

In May 2020, Ansys joined Microsoft, Dell and Lendlease on the steering committee of the Digital Twin Consortium, which aims to advance the use of digital twin technology. The company collaborated with the US Army and L3Harris to advance the use of FACE technical standard. In April, 2020, Samsung Foundry certified Ansys' RaptorH EM simulation solution for developing 2.5D/3D-ICs and systems-on-chip using Samsung's signoff flow. In August, 2020, Ansys received TSMC certification for its SoIC 3D chip stacking technology. In October, 2020, the company signed the agreement to acquire Analytical Graphics Inc. for $700 million.

In 2021, Optimo Medical AG integrated its Optimeyes digital twin technology with Ansys Mechanical to create identical copies of cornea for surgical procedure testing purposes. Ansys and Siemens Energy collaborated to improve additive manufacturing (AM) processes. In May 2021, Ansys acquired Phoenix Integration, Inc. for an undisclosed amount.

In November 2021, the company was certified for Samsung's 3 nm and 4 nm process technologies. The same year, Ansys acquired Zemax for an undisclosed amount. The company began supporting Arm-based Graviton2 processors, first time that Ansys' EDA semiconductor simulation solutions were made available on the Arm Neoverse architecture. In partnership with Cornell University, Ansys developed simulating courses.

In March 2022, the company announced collaboration with GlobalFoundries to address issues facing data centres. In April, 2022, Ansys announced signing a definitive agreement to acquire OnScale to expand its cloud portfolio.

In May 2022, Ansys acquired Motor Design Limited (MDL) for an undisclosed amount. In October, 2022, the company acquired C&R Technologies, a company that specialised in providing orbital thermal analysis.

In December 2022, Ansys announced that it had signed a definitive agreement to acquire DYNAmore, which specialises in developing simulation solutions for the automotive industry.

== See also ==
- List of aerospace engineering software
- List of automotive engineering software
