= MIDACO =

Software package

MIDACO (Mixed Integer Distributed Ant Colony Optimization) is a software package for numerical optimization based on evolutionary computing. MIDACO was created in collaboration of European Space Agency and EADS Astrium to solve constrained mixed-integer non-linear (MINLP) space applications. MIDACO holds several record solutions on interplanetary spaceflight trajectory design problems made publicly available by European Space Agency. MIDACO is included in software packages like TOMLAB, Astos, and SigmaXL.
