= Phoenix Integration =

- Type: Private
- Industry: Software Integration
- Founded: 1995
- Headquarters: Blacksburg, Virginia, US
- Key people: Scott Woyak, Ph.D., President and Founder; Brett Malone, Ph.D., Founder; Jane Trenaman, Chief Executive Officer; Jonathan Costello, Chief Technology Officer; Chris Randazzo, Vice President; Scott Ragon, Director of Technical Business Development; Alan Arico, Director of Sales & Marketing
- Products: ModelCenter Integrate; ModelCenter Explore; ModelCenter Cloud; AnalysisServer; MBSE Integration Tools
- Website: phoenix-int.com

Phoenix Integration, Inc was founded in 1995 to provide product design software to aerospace companies, defense contractors, heavy industry, as well as automotive and manufacturing companies.

Phoenix Integration developed and introduced ModelCenter and Analysis Server, software tools focused on workflow integration and multidisciplinary design optimization. The company released ModelCenter version 12.0, offering 64-bit functionality, on June 1, 2017.

The premier product of Phoenix Integration, ModelCenter, is used for integration of models and simulations, process automation, results visualization, design exploration and optimization, and workgroup data management. Global organizations that "leverage Phoenix solutions" include nine of the top 10 U.S. defense contractors and seven of the top 10 aerospace companies. Phoenix Integration maintains partnerships with numerous companies and organizations involved in engineering modeling and simulation.

Phoenix Integration's corporate headquarters are in Blacksburg, VA. The company maintains its commercial headquarters in Novi, MI and its European headquarters in Lyon, France.
