= Scientific programming language =

Type of programming language

Scientific programming language may refer to two related, yet distinct, concepts in computer programming. In a broad sense, it describes any programming language used extensively in computational science and computational mathematics, such as C, C++, Python, and Java. In a stricter sense, it designates languages that are designed and optimized for handling mathematical formulas and matrix operations, offering intrinsic support for these tasks.

== Overview ==
In the broad sense, a scientific programming language is one that is applied to numerical modeling, simulation, data analysis, and visualization. Languages such as Python, through libraries like NumPy, SciPy, and Matplotlib, have become dominant in fields ranging from machine learning to high-performance computing. Conversely, the strict sense emphasizes languages that provide built‐in support for matrix arithmetic and symbolic computation. Examples include Fortran, MATLAB, Julia, Octave, and R. These languages are characterized by syntax that closely mirrors mathematical notation, enabling concise expression of complex formulas and operations.

== Historical context and evolution ==
Historically, languages like ALGOL and Fortran laid the groundwork for scientific computing by introducing high-level constructs that enabled efficient numerical computations. Over time, the advent of proprietary tools such as MATLAB and open-source alternatives like GNU Octave expanded accessibility. In recent years, modern languages like Julia have emerged to combine high performance with an expressive syntax, while general-purpose languages such as Python have evolved through robust scientific libraries to address a wide range of computational problems.

== Key features ==
Scientific programming languages, particularly in the strict sense, typically include:

- Native or intrinsic support for arrays, vectors, and matrices.
- Concise syntax for mathematical operations.
- Advanced libraries for numerical linear algebra, optimization, and statistical analysis.
- Facilities for both symbolic and numerical computation.
- Tools for visualization and data exploration.

== Comparative examples ==
=== Linear algebra ===
Languages with built-in support for matrix operations allow users to work directly with mathematical constructs. For example, the following Julia code solves a system of linear equations:

A = rand(20, 20)  # A is a 20x20 matrix
b = rand(20)      # b is a 20-element vector
x = A \ b         # x is the solution to A*x = b

In contrast, Python—although a general-purpose language—provides similar functionality via its libraries:

import numpy as np
A = np.random.rand(20, 20)
b = np.random.rand(20)
x = np.linalg.solve(A, b)

This comparison highlights how general-purpose languages extend their capabilities with specialized libraries, whereas strict scientific languages often incorporate such features directly.

=== Mathematical optimization ===
Scientific programming languages also facilitate optimization tasks with syntax that closely mirrors mathematical notation. The following Julia example finds the minimum of the polynomial:

$P(x,y) = x^2 - 3xy + 5y^2 - 7y + 3$

using Optim

P(x,y) = x^2 - 3x*y + 5y^2 - 7y + 3

z₀ = [0.0, 0.0]     # Starting point for the optimization algorithm

optimize(z -> P(z...), z₀, Newton(); autodiff = :forward)

Python offers comparable optimization routines through libraries such as SciPy, where automatic differentiation and specialized algorithms are available, albeit not as an intrinsic language feature.

== Modern trends and emerging languages ==
Recent trends in scientific computing emphasize both performance and ease of use. Modern languages like Julia have been designed specifically to address these demands, combining the clarity of high-level syntax with the efficiency required for large-scale numerical computation. Additionally, emerging languages such as Nim are gaining attention due to their performance and available libraries for linear algebra, even though they rely on external libraries rather than built-in support. This nuanced landscape demonstrates that the term "scientific programming language" is evolving alongside computational needs and technological advances.

== Language classification ==
A comparative overview of languages used in scientific computing is provided in the table below:

Language	Classification	Key Features
Fortran	Strict Sense	High performance, long-standing use in numerical and high-performance computing.
MATLAB	Strict Sense	Extensive toolboxes, proprietary software, widely used in academia and engineering.
Julia	Strict Sense	High-performance, open-source, built-in matrix support, and growing ecosystem.
R	Strict Sense	Specialized in statistical computing and graphics, extensive package ecosystem.
GNU Octave	Strict Sense	Open-source alternative to MATLAB with high compatibility.
Maple	Strict Sense	Computer algebra system for symbolic mathematics and interactive problem solving.
APL and J	Strict Sense	Concise array programming languages suited for mathematical operations, though niche.
ALGOL	Strict Sense	Historically significant language that influenced many modern programming languages.
Python	Broad Sense	Versatile general-purpose language with powerful libraries (NumPy, SciPy) for scientific computing.
C/C++	Broad Sense	Used for performance-critical applications with libraries such as BLAS and LAPACK.
Java	Broad Sense	Supports scientific computing via libraries like Apache Commons Math and ND4J.
Nim	Emerging (Broad Sense)	Offers fast performance with available libraries for linear algebra, though relying on external support.

== Conclusion ==
The field of scientific programming languages continues to evolve, driven by the demands of modern computational science. While strict scientific languages offer built-in support for mathematical operations, general-purpose languages have successfully expanded their roles through specialized libraries. This evolution reflects a broader trend towards making scientific computing more accessible, efficient, and versatile.

== See also ==
- Linear algebra
- Mathematical optimization
- Convex optimization
- Linear programming
- Quadratic programming
- Computational science
- Scientific computing
