= ModeFRONTIER =

Multidisciplinary design optimization (MDO) platform

modeFRONTIER
- Developer: Esteco S.p.A.
- Initial release: 1999
- Stable release: 2026R1 / March 9, 2026
- Operating system: Cross-platform
- Type: Technical computing
- License: Proprietary
- Website: engineering.esteco.com

modeFRONTIER is software for simulation process automation and design exploration developed by ESTECO, an Italian engineering software house.

== History (1999-) ==
modeFRONTIER was released in 1999 by ESTECO as a spin-off of the EU research project on "Design Optimization" called FRONTIER. The initial work on the project started in 1996 with the collaboration of British Aerospace (UK), Parallab (Norway), University of Trieste, University of Newcastle (UK), Daimler-Benz Aerospace (DASA) (Germany), Defense Evaluation and Research Agency (UK), Electrolux-Zanussi (Italy) and Calortecnica (Italy). The project's main objective was to develop a technology for design optimization based on the cornerstone of "design analysis".

In 1999, following the end of the project, ESTECO was founded and released a commercial version of the FRONTIER software, which was later called modeFRONTIER. The software has since then undergone continuous development and improvements based on the company's expertise in multidisciplinary optimization and design exploration.

In 2017, after a thorough competitive analysis, Zunum Aero selected modeFRONTIER as its preferred MDO platform that can help push the limits of battery technology and electric propulsion. In 2017, modeFRONTIER was also used in the HI-SEAS Mission V, a NASA-funded research project, to help researchers develop system models for sustainable living on Mars.

Over the years, modeFRONTIER has been featured in several research publications, journals and books.

== Features and capabilities ==
modeFRONTIER has a set of features that enable users to automate the simulation process, explore the design space, and use data to make informed decisions. Some of its key features include:

- Simulation Process Integration and Automation: The software enables users to create, execute, optimize, and monitor complex simulation chains for MDO projects. Users can automate repetitive tasks in a process, streamlining the process and accelerating optimization studies.
- Design Optimization: modeFRONTIER provides users with advanced numerical techniques, such as Design of Experiments (DoE) and RSM-based modeling, to achieve optimal design results.
- Integration with Parametric Tools: The platform integrates with various third-party engineering tools, including CAD, CAE, and CFD packages.
- HPC and Cloud Technology: With modeFRONTIER, users can handle large amounts of data, visualize their simulation results, and evaluate the impact of different input assumptions and scenarios.

== Applications ==
modeFRONTIER is widely used across various industries and engineering disciplines, including but not limited to automotive, aerospace, marine, healthcare, architecture and construction, and energy and environmental engineering. Engineering teams across these sectors use modeFRONTIER to optimize various engineering processes, while reducing complexity, improving product performance and cutting development time.

modeFRONTIER is also broadly adopted in academia and research institutions and has become a fundamental tool for researchers and students working on optimization-related projects.

== See also ==
- Multidisciplinary Optimization (MDO)
