= ConeXpress =

ConeXpress was a concept orbital life extension vehicle project that was co-funded by ESA and Orbital Recovery Ltd. The Ariane-5 interface cone structure would be the basis. ConeExpress satellites would travel to the Geostationary orbit, lock on to satellites that have run out of fuel and extend their lives. It was conceived to provide the operators of geostationary communications satellites with an opportunity to extend the revenue-earning life of select space assets by up to 10 years.

== Docking ==
The onboard docking equipment consisted of a capture tool that inserts a probe into the throat of the apogee motor of the Client satellite, locks itself to the throat by expanding the crown of the probe, and pulls the Client satellite back towards it by retracting the probe. This process is reversed for undocking. ConeXpress was sized to work with dock with satellites weighing up to 2,500 kilograms (5,500 lb).

== Specifications ==
- Shape: Conical
- Base Dimension: 2.6m
- Height: 0.9m
- Power: Solar Panels
- Solar Wing Span: 15m
- Mass: 1400 kg
- Propulsion: Ion Engines

== ConeXpress Partners ==
Partners included:

- Dutch Space
- Arianespace
- EADS CASA Espacio
- Oerlikon Space
- GMV
- Kayser-Threde
- DLR
- NLR
- Sener
- Snecma Moteurs
- Swedish Space Corporation
