= PIDO =

PIDO stands for Process Integration and Design Optimization. Process Integration is necessary because multiple software tools are often used in multi-domain system design. Control software is developed using a different toolchain than the one used for analyzing the mechanical properties of a system, which again employs different tools for structural analysis. To optimize a design, communication between these tools is essential.

The ultimate goal, design optimization, can be achieved by defining cost functions and identifying the parameters that can be adjusted to align the design with the cost function(s).
