= ModelCenter =

- Developers: Phoenix Integration, Inc.
- Stable release: 11
- Operating system: Windows
- Type: Technical computing
- License: Proprietary

ModelCenter, developed by Phoenix Integration, is a software package that aids in the design and optimization of systems. It enables users to conduct trade studies, as well as optimize designs. It interacts with other common modeling tools, including Systems Tool Kit, PTC Integrity Modeler, IBM Rhapsody, No Magic, Matlab, Nastran, Microsoft Excel, and Wolfram SystemModeler. ModelCenter also has tools to enable collaboration among design team members.

== Modules and Packs ==
- RSM Toolkit 3.0 gives users a mathematical model based on source data from simulations or actual experiments. This new model can then be integrated as a component within another model within ModelCenter.
- QuickWrap 3.0 automates batch mode programs.
- The Enhanced Workflow Module allows workflows to be graphically constructed and executed.
- The Visualization Pak helps users to visualize the design space and perform trade studies.
- The Optimization Pak includes various tools to allow users to optimize designs after integrating the components of the model. Tools within this pack include the Design of Experiments Tool, Variable Influence Profiler, Gradient Based Optimization, and Prediction Profiler. The Optimization pack has over 30 optimization algorithms.
- The CAD Fusion Pak allows users to incorporate work from popular CAD packages into the analysis on designs within ModelCenter.

== Applications ==
ModelCenter is used in a variety of applications, primarily system design and optimization in the aerospace and defense industry. It is also used for process design and optimization in the automotive, manufacturing, electronics, building design, and consumer products industries.

== Examples of use ==
- ModelCenter served as the environment in which to integrate the Life-Cycle Cost Analysis Model into the Integrated Program Model for NASA's Constellation Program.
- ModelCenter was used in pre-concept design work of an unmanned combat aerial vehicle. Engineers integrated various analysis modules within ModelCenter, and also used ModelCenter for design of experiments.
- Volvo used ModelCenter in its MDO Process Workflow Integration.
- Airbus selected ModelCenter to run engineering studies, including design of experiments and optimization. ModelCenter was one of several commercial software packages integrated into Airbus's integrated aerodynamic framework.

== See also ==
- Multidisciplinary design optimization
- Phoenix Integration
- Simulink
