= ASTOS =

- ASTOS running on Windows 7 showing GRACE mission
- Developer(s): Astos Solutions GmbH
- Stable release: 9.17.0 / April 2, 2021
- Operating system: Cross-platform
- Type: Technical computing
- License: Proprietary
- Website: ASTOS product website

ASTOS is a tool dedicated to mission analysis, Trajectory optimization, vehicle design and simulation for space scenarios, i.e. launch, re-entry missions, orbit transfers, Earth observation, navigation, coverage and re-entry safety assessments. It solves Aerospace problems with a data driven interface and automatic initial guesses. Since 1989, with the support of the European Space Agency, it has developed, and improved this trajectory optimization environment to compute optimal trajectories for a variety of complex multi-phase Optimal control problems. ASTOS is being extensively used at ESA and aerospace industry community to calculate mission analysis, optimal launch and entry trajectories and was one of the tools used by ESA to assess the risk due to the ATV 'Jules Verne' re-entry. ASTOS is compatible with Windows and Linux platforms and is maintained and commercialized by Astos Solutions GmbH.

== History ==
The development of ASTOS (formerly named ALTOS) started in 1989 at the DLR in Oberpfaffenhofen and MBB (now Astrium). In 1991 the Institute of Flight Mechanics and Control (IFR) at the University of Stuttgart under the head of Prof. Klaus Well took the responsibility for the development of ASTOS. In 1999 the commercialization of ASTOS began. In the period 2001-2006 ASTOS was sold by Technology Transfer Initiative of the University of Stuttgart (TTI). Since September 2006, the newly founded company Astos Solutions GmbH is responsible for development and sales of ASTOS.

== Projects ==
ASTOS is being extensively used in aerospace agencies and industry since 1998, hereafter a not complete list of project is presented where the software was involved during the design or accomplishment of the space mission.

- Performance map of conventional launch vehicle: Ariane 6, Ariane 5, Vega, Soyuz from Guiana Space Centre, several FLPP concepts, VLM
- Feasibility study of reusable launch vehicle: Hopper, Skylon, SpaceLiner, Fast 20XX ALPHA.
- Earth Atmospheric re-entry: X-38, Atmospheric Reentry Demonstrator, IXV, EXPERT.
- Safety aspect related to the ATV re-entry.
- Planetary re-entry: Beagle 2, ExoMars, Huygens.
- Orbit transfer and Space rendezvous: ConeXpress, DLR DEOS, OHB SE Electra.
- Sounding rocket: SHEFEX II and III, Maser11.
- Mission Analysis: STE-QUEST,

== See also ==
- Trajectory optimization
- General Mission Analysis Tool
