= ALGLIB =

Open source numerical analysis library

- Original author: Bochkanov Sergey Anatolyevich
- Developer: ALGLIB LTD (UK)
- Stable release: 4.06 / 7 October 2025; 4 months ago
- Operating system: Cross-platform
- Type: Numerical library
- License: Dual (commercial, GPL)
- Website: www.alglib.net

ALGLIB is a cross-platform open source numerical analysis and data processing library. It can be used from several programming languages (C++, C#, VB.NET, Python, Delphi, Java).

ALGLIB started in 1999 and has a long history of steady development with 3 releases per year. It is used by several open-source projects, commercial libraries, and applications (e.g. TOL project, Math.NET Numerics, SpaceClaim).

== Features ==
Distinctive features of the library are:

- Support for several programming languages with identical APIs (C++, C#, FreePascal/Delphi, VB.NET, Python, and Java)
- Self-contained code with no mandatory external dependencies and easy installation
- Portability (it was tested under x86/x86-64/ARM, Windows and Linux)
- Two independent backends (pure C# implementation, native C implementation) with automatically generated APIs (C++, C#, ...)
- Same functionality of commercial and GPL versions, with enhancements for speed and parallelism provided in the commercial version

The most actively developed parts of ALGLIB are:

- Mixed-integer optimization, with support for analytic and derivative-free MINLP problems.
- Continuous optimization, with LP, QP, QCQP, SOCP (and other conic problem types) and NLP solvers, derivative-free global solvers and multiobjective optimization algorithms.
- Linear algebra, offering a comprehensive set of both dense and sparse linear solvers and factorizations
- Interpolation, featuring standard algorithms like polynomials and 1D/2D splines, as well as several unique large-scale interpolation/fitting algorithms. These include penalized 1D/2D splines, fast thin plate splines and fast polyharmonic splines, all scalable to hundreds of thousands of points.
- Least squares solvers, including linear/nonlinear unconstrained and constrained least squares and curve fitting solvers
- Data analysis, with various algorithms being implemented

The other functions in the library include:

- Fast Fourier transforms
- Numerical integration
- Ordinary differential equations
- Special functions
- Statistics (descriptive statistics, hypothesis testing)
- Multiple precision versions of linear algebra, interpolation and optimization algorithms (using MPFR for floating point computations)

== See also ==
- List of numerical analysis software
- List of numerical libraries
- List of open-source mathematical libraries
