= Ruth Misener =

American computer scientist and academic

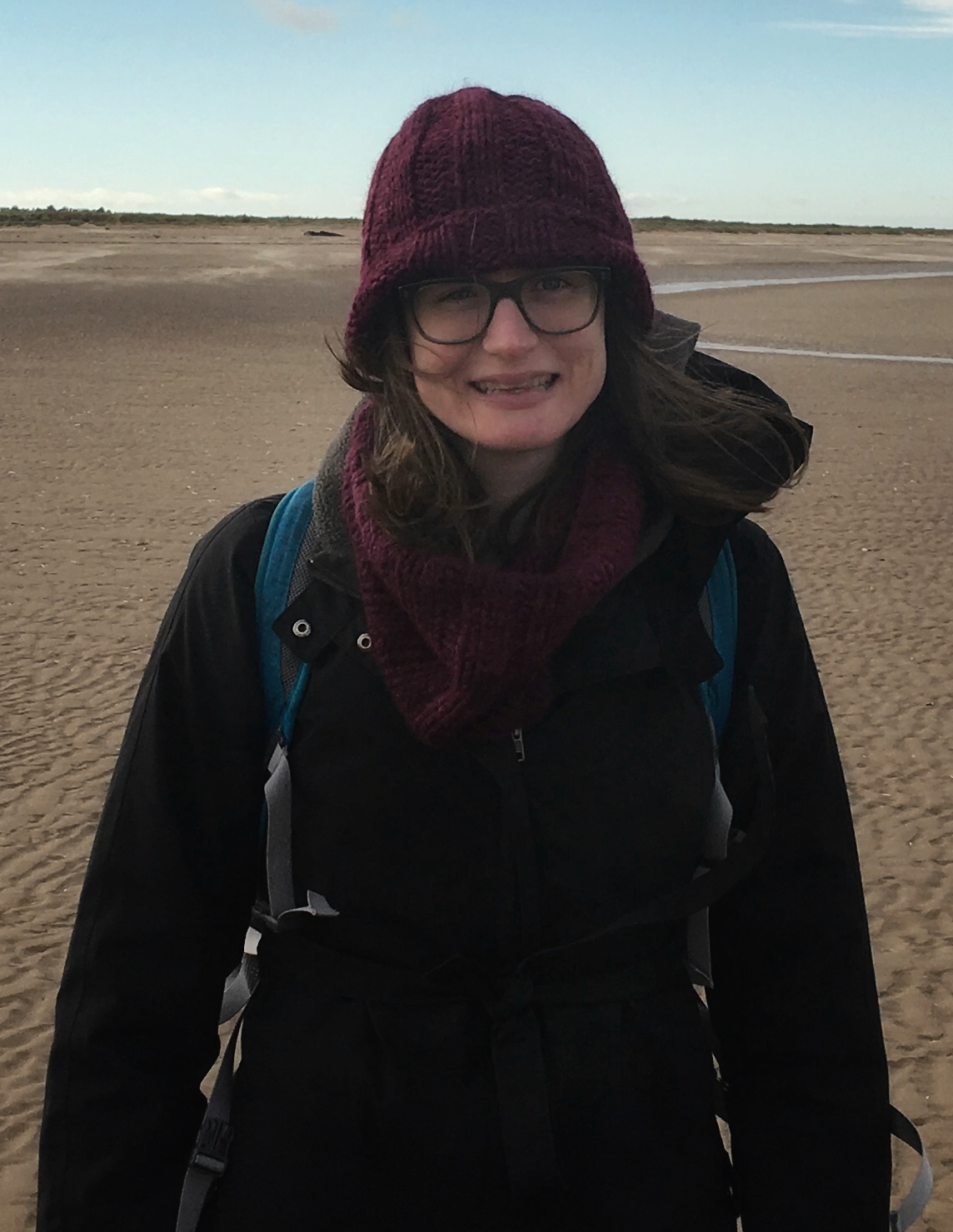
- Misener in 2018
- Education: Princeton University; MIT
- Awards: Sir George Macfarlane Medal (2017) RAEng Engineers Trust Young Engineer of the Year (2017) W. David Smith Jr. Graduate Student Paper Award (2014)
- Scientific career
- Fields: Optimisation Methods and Computation
- Workplaces: Imperial College London
- Thesis: Novel Global Optimization Methods: Theoretical and Computational Studies on Pooling Problems with Environmental Constraints (2012)
- Doctoral advisor: Christodoulos Floudas
- Website: wp.doc.ic.ac.uk/rmisener/

Ruth Misener is a software engineer and professor at the Department of Computing, Imperial College London. Her research concentrates on the development of software and optimisation algorithms for energy efficient engineering and biomedical systems.

== Education ==
Misener completed her bachelor's in chemical engineering at MIT in 2007. She moved to Princeton under Christodoulos Floudas for her PhD, "Novel Global Optimization Methods: Theoretical and Computational Studies on Pooling Problems with Environmental Constraints", which she submitted in 2012. Here she was funded by a Graduate Research Fellowship from the USA National Science Foundation. At Princeton she won an award recognising Excellence in Teaching.

== Research ==
In 2012 she was awarded a Royal Academy of Engineering Research Fellowship for her postdoctoral training with Efstratios N. Pistikopoulos at Imperial College London. Misener works in the Computational Optimisation group at Imperial College London, where she is interested in bioprocess optimisation and petrochemical process network design. She has several industry collaborations, including being academic friend for ExxonMobil.

In 2017 she was awarded an EPSRC Early Career Fellowship for "software development for novel engineering research". The aim of this fellowship was to develop new "decision-making software constructing and deploying next generation process optimisation tools". In 2022 she was awarded a highly prestigious BASF/Royal Academy of Engineering Research Chair in Data-driven Optimisation. She has co-authored several publicly available software tools for global optimisation including:

- APOGEE (pooling)
- GloMIQO (mixed-integer quadratically constrained quadratic programs)
- ANTIGONE (mixed-integer nonlinear programs)

She is the director of the Computing & Systems Technology Division of the American Institute of Chemical Engineers.

== Awards ==
In 2013 she was awarded the Journal of Global Optimization award for Best Paper. In 2014 she won the American Institute of Chemical Engineers W David Smith Graduate Student Paper Award. In 2017 Misener won the Sir George Macfarlane Medal from the Royal Academy of Engineering for excellence in the early stage of her career. She also won the 2017 Royal Academy of Engineering Engineers Trust Young Engineer of the Year. She was included in the Innovation category of American Institute of Chemical Engineers 35 Under 35 list.
