= Ignacio Grossmann =

American chemical engineer (born 1949)

Ignacio E Grossmann
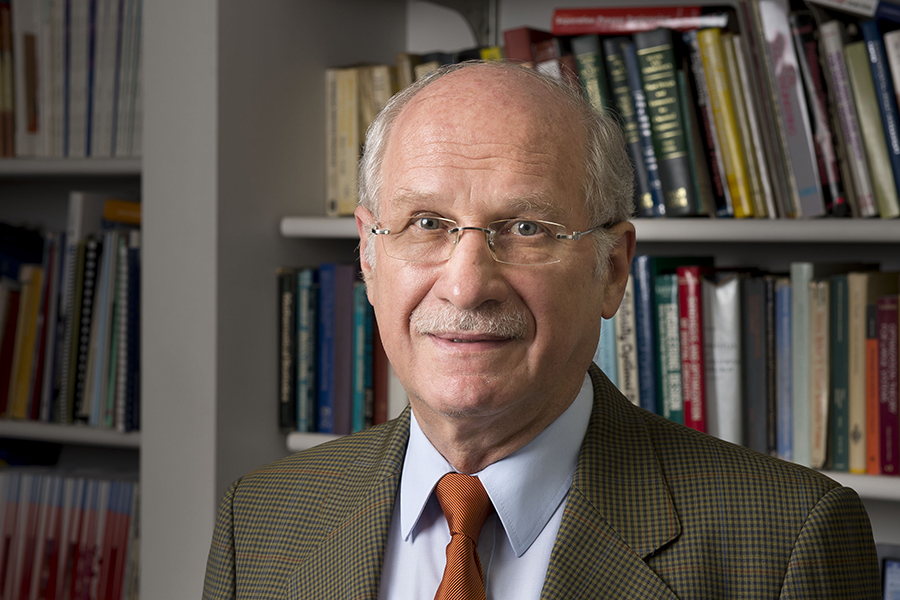
- Born: 1949 (age 76–77); Mexico City, Mexico
- Education: Universidad Iberoamericana, Imperial College London
- Known for: Mixed-Integer Nonlinear Programming
- Awards: Member of National Academy of Engineering
- Scientific career
- Fields: Process systems engineering, optimization
- Workplaces: Carnegie Mellon University
- Doctoral advisor: Roger Sargent
- Notable students: Christodoulos Floudas, Christos Maravelias, Efstratios N. Pistikopoulos, Nikolaos Sahinidis, Metin Turkay, Fengqi You
- Website: http://egon.cheme.cmu.edu

Ignacio E. Grossmann (born 1949) is an American chemical engineer. He is the R. R. Dean University Professor in the department of chemical engineering at Carnegie Mellon University. Grossmann received his B.S. degree from Universidad Iberoamericana in Mexico City in 1974. He did his M.S. and Ph.D. at Imperial College London with Roger W. H. Sargent in 1975 and 1977 respectively. In 2015 he was the first recipient of the Sargent Medal of the Institution of Chemical Engineers, named in honor of his doctoral advisor.

Grossmann is a member of US National Academy of Engineering, and Fellow of the American Institute of Chemical Engineers (AIChE), and a Fellow of Institute for Operations Research and the Management Sciences (INFORMS). In 2026, he was made a fellow of The Royal Academy of Engineering. He has a large academic family tree, and has an H-index of 147 by Google Scholar. He is a member and former director of the Center for Advanced Process Decision-making, an industrial consortium that involves 20 petroleum, chemical, engineering, and software companies.

His main research interests are in the areas of discrete/continuous optimization, optimal synthesisr and planning of chemical processes and energy systems, supply chain optimization, and optimization under uncertainty.

== Publications ==
Grossmann has authored more than 700 papers and is a co-author of the text book "Systematic Methods of Chemical Process Design" and author of the textbook "Advanced Optimization for Process Systems Engineering". His main contributions are through peer-reviewed articles on mixed-integer nonlinear programming, heat integration, production scheduling, among others.

The outer-approximation algorithm was created by Duran and Grossmann as a way to solve mixed-integer nonlinear programming (MINLP) problems, specifically those where binary variables enter linearly and nonlinear functions exist for continuous variables. This method is based upon alternating between nonlinear programming (NLP) subproblems and mixed-integer linear programming (MILP) master problems. Linear approximations are used in the master problems to aid in identifying potential discrete decisions.

== Honors and awards ==
- Fellow, Royal Academy of Engineering, 2026
- John M. Prausnitz AIChE Institute Lecturer, 2024
- INFORMS Journal of Computing Test of Time Paper Award for 1997-2001, 2024
- INFORMS Senior Member, 2024
- Doctor Honoris Causa, Universidad Nacional del Sur, Bahia Blanca, Argentina, 2024
- Number 2 Lifetime Ranking Among All Scholars Worldwide in Mathematical Optimization, ScholarGPS 2023
- Number 10 in Lifetime Ranking Among All Scholars Worldwide in Chemical Engineering, ScholarGPS 2023
- Kun Li Award for Excellence in Education, 2023
- Frontiers in Chemical Engineering, “A Review of Stochastic Programming Methods for Optimization of Process Systems Under Uncertainty," C. Li and I.E. Grossmann
- Honorary Doctor of Engineering Sciences, RWTH Aachen University, Aachen, September 2021.
- 2nd Best Presentation at MINLP Virtual Workshop, Imperial College London, June 2021
- Founders Award for Outstanding Contributions to the Field of Chemical Engineering, AIChE, 2019.
- Albert Nelson Marquis Lifetime Award, Marquis Who's Who, 2019.
- 2019 Top Cited Scientist in Computer Science and Electronics: 53 Worldwide, 38 National, 115 H-Index.
- Doctor Honoris Causa, Universidad de Alicante, Alicante, Spain, 2019.
- Distinguished Visiting Professor, Tsinghua University, China, 2018.
- Doctor Honoris Causa, Universidad Nacional del Litoral, Santa Fe, Argentina, 2018.
- 2017 Award for Long Term Achievements in Computer Aided Process Engineering, Working Party on CAPE of the European Federation of Chemical Engineering, 2017.
- ETH Zürich Chemical Engineering Medal, 2017
- Hougen Lectureship, University of Wisconsin, Madison, 2017
- Honorary Doctor, Kazan National Research Technological University, Kazan, Russia, 2016.
- Doctor Honoris Causa, Universidad de Cantabria, Santander, Spain, 2016.
- One of the Most Influential Scientific Minds, Thompson Reuters, 2015.
- Tsinghua Forum Award of Chemical Engineering, Tsinghua University, Beijing, January, 2016.
- 5th KAIST CBE Global Distinguished Lecture, KAIST, Daejon, Republic Korea
- Best Technical Paper 2014, Computers and Chemical Engineering, Salt Lake City, 2015
- Chemical Engineering Division's Lectureship Award, ASEE, Seattle, 2015.
- Sargent Medal, Institution of Chemical Engineers, U.K., 2015.
- Constantin Caratheodory Prize, International Society of Global Optimization, 2015
- PROSE award 2015 for chapter in the book “Distillation–Fundamentals and Principles”, (Ed. A Gorak, E. Sorensen)
- Distinguished Professor of Engineering Award, Carnegie Mellon University, 2014.
- 6th James Y. Oldshue Lecture, XXVII Interamerican Congress of Chemical Engineering, Cartagena, Colombia, 2014.
- Inaugural CAPEC-Process Lecture, Technical University of Denmark, Lyngby, 2014.
- Thomson Reuters Highly Cited Researcher, 2014.
- Zadmer Distinguished Lecture, University of Calgary, Calgary, 2014.
- Ashland Prof. C.N.R. Rao Medal and CHEMCON Distinguished Speaker Award, Indian Institute of Chemical Engineers, Mumbai, 2013.
- Richard S.H. Mah Memorial Lecture, Northwestern University, Evanston, 2013.
- Inaugural Les Shemilt Lecture McMaster University, Hamilton, Canada, 2013
- Agustin Vazquez Vera Lectureship, Instituto Tecnologico de Celaya, Mexico, 2013.
- Luis Federico Leloir Award for International Cooperation, Buenos Aires, Argentina, 2012.
- Texas Distinguished Faculty Lectureship, University of Texas, Austin, 2012
- Chemical and Biochemical Engineering Distinguished Lecture, Western University, London, Canada, 2012.
- Walter J. Weber, Jr. Distinguished Lecture, University of Michigan, 2012.
- Doctor in Engineering Honoris Causa, Technical University of Dortmund, 2012
- Research Excellence in Sustainable Engineering Award, AIChE, 2011
- Basore Distinguished Lecture, Auburn University, 2011
- Discrete Optimization Top Cited Article 2005-2010
- Warren Lewis Award for Excellence in Education, AIChE, 2009
- Named as one of the “One Hundred Engineers of the Modern Era” by AICHE, 2008
- Outstanding Contributed Paper Award, FOCAPO Meeting, 2008
- ExxonMobil Lecture, Department of Chemical Engineering, University of Massachusetts, Amherst, 2007
- Doctor Honoris Causa, University of Maribor, Slovenia, 2007
- Kun Li Award for Excellence in Education, 2007
- Pfizer Distinguished Lecture, University of Kansas, 2006
- Kelly Lecturer, Purdue University, 2005
- Fellow AIChE, 2004
- 10th Roger Sargent Lecture, Imperial College, London
- INFORMS Computing Society Prize, 2003
- Fulbright Senior Lectureship, 2003
- Fellow INFORMS, 2002
- Top 15 Most Cited Author in Computer Science, ISI, 2002
- Doctor in Technology h.c., Åbo Akademi, 2002.
- Ashton Carry Lecture, Department of Chemical Engineering, Georgia Institute of Technology, Atlanta, 2002.
- University Professor, Carnegie Mellon University, 2001.
- Best Technical Paper 2000, Computers and Chemical Engineering.
- Corresponding Member of Mexican Academy of Sciences, 2000.
- Steven J. Fenves Award for Systems Research, CIT, Carnegie Mellon, 2000.
- Member National Academy of Engineering, 2000.
- Technical Achievement Award in Academic Research, HENAAC, 2000.
- Best Technical Paper 1998, Computers and Chemical Engineering.
- Gambrinus Award, University of Dortmund, 1999.
- Academic Member of Mexican Academy of Engineering, 1999.
- William H. Walker Award for Excellence in Contributions to Chemical Engineering Literature, AIChE, 1997.
- Best Technical Paper 1996, Computers and Chemical Engineering.
- Computing in Chemical Engineering Award, CAST Division, AIChE, 1994.
- Best Technical Paper 1988, Computers and Chemical Engineering.
- Mary Upson Visiting Professorship of Engineering, Cornell University, Ithaca, 1986-87.
- Robert W. Vaughan Lectureship in Chemical Engineering, California Institute of Technology, Pasadena, 1986.
- Presidential Young Investigator Award, National Science Foundation, 1984.
- Scholarship from British Council, 1974-77.
- Medal Best Student of Mexico, National Council of Science and Technology, 1974.
- Listed in American Men and Women of Science, Who's Who in America, Men of Achievement.
