= Claire Adjiman =

Chemical-engineering researcher

- Education: Imperial College London; Princeton University
- Spouse: Costas Pantelides
- Scientific career
- Fields: Process systems engineering
- Workplaces: Imperial College London
- Thesis: Global Optimization Techniques for Process Systems Engineering (1998)
- Doctoral advisor: Christodoulos A. Floudas

Claire Sandrine Jacqueline Adjiman is a professor of Chemical Engineering at the Department of Chemical Engineering at Imperial College London and a Fellow of the Royal Academy of Engineering.

== Early life and education ==
Claire Sandrine Jacqueline Adjiman was raised in France and relocated to London in 1988. Adjiman received a master's degree in chemical engineering from Imperial College London in 1993. She completed a PhD under Christodoulos A. Floudas at Princeton University in 1998 and her thesis was titled 'Global optimization Techniques for Process Systems Engineering' .

== Research ==
In 1998 she joined the faculty at Imperial College London, where she was awarded a Royal Academy of Engineering - Imperial Chemical Industries fellowship. She was appointed to Senior Lecturer in 2003 and Professor in 2011. She was a visiting professor at the Department of Chemistry at University of Warwick between 2007 and 2010. Her research focuses on integrating molecular level decisions into process design, property prediction and optimisation. Her group are developing computer-based process design techniques to improve the process economics as well as the material and energy efficiency. She is considered an expert in engineering molecular systems. Adjiman works with the oil and gas industry, solid oxide fuel cells and CO_{2} capture.

In 2012 she was awarded an Engineering and Physical Sciences Research Council Leadership Fellowship. She is the Director of Centre for Process Systems Engineering at Imperial College London and is the co-director of the Institute of Molecular Science and Engineering at Imperial College London.

In 2015 she was elected to the Royal Academy of Engineering. In 2016 she was elected to the Royal Society of Chemistry. In 2023 she was elected to the USA National Academy of Engineering.

She is on the editorial board of the journals Molecular Systems Design & Engineering and Fluid Phase Equilibria. She is an Associate Editor for the journals Chemical Engineering Science and Journal of Global Optimization.

== Awards ==
2009 - Leverhulme Trust Philip Leverhulme Prize for Engineering

2009 - Imperial College London Research Excellence Award

2011 - Society of Chemical Industry Henry Armstrong Lecture, Process Design: Don't Take the Molecules For Granted
