= Computers & Chemical Engineering =

- Discipline: Process Systems Engineering; Computer Science; Chemical Engineering
- Language: English

Publication details
- History: 1977–present
- Publisher: Elsevier
- Frequency: Monthly, 12 issues per year
- Impact factor: 4.000 (2019)

Standard abbreviations
- ISO 4: Comput. Chem. Eng.

Indexing
- ISSN: 0098-1354

Links
- Journal homepage

Computers & Chemical Engineering is an international, peer-reviewed scientific journal in the field of process systems engineering. The journal accepts general papers on process systems engineering, as well as emerging new areas and topics for new developments in the application of computing and systems technology to chemical engineering problems. The journal was founded in 1977 and is published 12 times a year. The journal's current Editor-in-Chief is Efstratios N. Pistikopoulos, and editors are J. H. Lee, A.B. Póvoa, and Fengqi You. Computers & Chemical Engineering offers authors two choices to publish their research: Gold Open Access and Subscription. Its impact factor is 4.000 in 2019.
