= Richard S. H. Mah =

Chinese-born chemical engineer (1934–2004)

- Born: 16 December 1934; Shanghai, China
- Died: 30 May 2004 (aged 69); Glenview, Illinois, United States
- Education: Imperial College London
- Scientific career
- Fields: Chemical Engineering, Process Systems Engineering
- Workplaces: Northwestern University
- Doctoral advisor: Roger Sargent

Richard S. H. Mah (16 December 1934 – 30 May 2004) was a Chinese-born chemical engineer and professor at Northwestern University in the United States.

== Early life and education ==
Mah was born in Shanghai on 16 December 1934, to parents S. Fabian Soh Pai and E. Shang (Chang). Mah's parents sent him to England in 1950. Mah completed a Bachelor of Science in chemical engineering from the University of Birmingham, and received his Ph.D. in 1961 from the Imperial College London under the guidance of Roger W. H. Sargent on process systems engineering. Mah became the first Ph.D. graduate from the Sargent research group. Mah moved to the University of Minnesota in 1961 for his postdoctoral work. Mah married Stella Lee in 1962.

== Career ==
Mah worked for Union Carbide between 1963 and 1967, then Esso. He joined the faculty of Northwestern University in 1972 as an associate professor, and retired in 1994 as a professor. Mah was a fellow of the American Institute of Chemical Engineers, and received its Computing in Chemical Engineering Award, Ernest Thiele Award, and other divisional awards. He was also awarded the American Society for Quality Jack Youden Prize.

== Books ==
- Mah, Richard S.; Seider, Warren D., eds. (1981). Foundations of Computer-Aided Chemical Process Design. New York: Engineering Foundation. 2 volumes
- Mah, Richard S. H. (1990). Chemical Process Structures and Information Flows. Butterworth.

== Death and legacy ==
Mah died on 30 May 2004 due to a heart attack at the age of 69 in Glenview, Illinois. From 2005, the department of chemical and biological engineering at Northwestern University held an annual Mah Memorial Lecture in his honor.
