= Coonce =

Coonce is a surname. Notable people with the surname include:

- Garth Coonce (1937–2023), American televangelist
- Harry Coonce (1938–2025), American mathematician
- Rick Coonce (1946–2011), American drummer
