= Environmental impact of bitcoin =

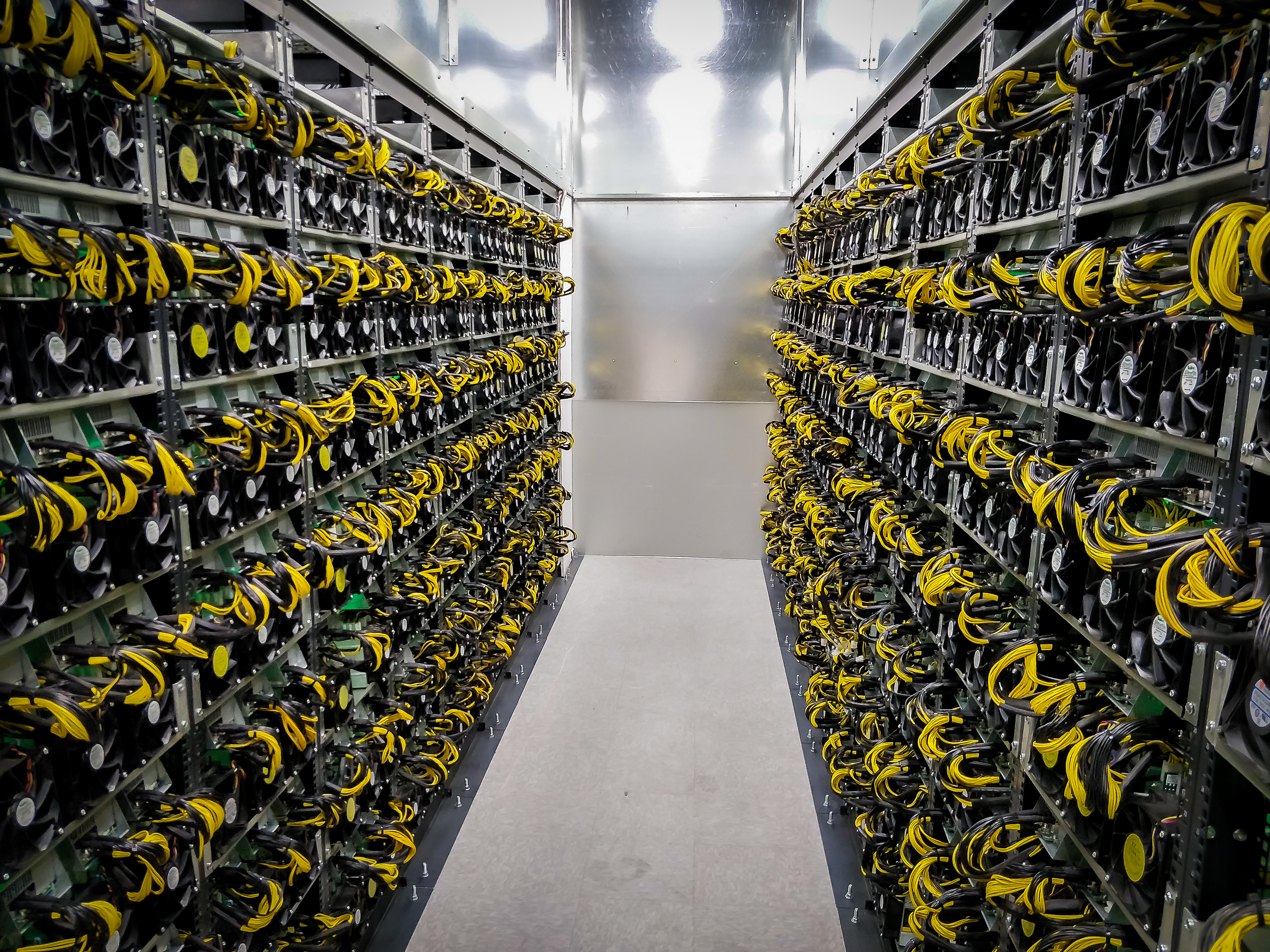
Bitcoin mining facility in Quebec, Canada

The environmental impact of bitcoin has been characterized in the literature as significant, particularly for its energy use, greenhouse gas emissions, and electronic waste. Bitcoin mining, the process by which bitcoins are created and transactions are finalized, requires tremendous compute, thereby both consuming energy and emitting carbon in abundance. According to the 2025 Cambridge Digital Mining Industry Report, surveyed miners reported that 48% of their electricity came from fossil fuels and 52% from sustainable energy sources, including renewables and nuclear. Moreover, bitcoins are mined on specialized computer hardware that physically degrades through use, resulting in electronic waste. As of 2025, several empirical studies report an association between higher bitcoin-mining electricity use and worse environmental-sustainability indicators. Bitcoin's environmental impact has attracted the attention of regulators, leading to incentives or restrictions in various jurisdictions.

The OECD and the U.S. OSTP have discussed ways in which the environmental impact of crypto mining might be reduced, which includes grid balancing, use of otherwise-vented methane, and curtailed renewable electricity.

== Environmental impact ==
=== Greenhouse gas emissions ===
==== Mining as an electricity-intensive process ====
Electricity consumption of the bitcoin network since 2016 (annualized). The upper and lower bounds are based on worst-case and best-case scenario assumptions, respectively. The red trace indicates an intermediate best-guess estimate.

Bitcoin mining is a highly electricity-intensive proof-of-work process. Miners run dedicated software to compete against each other and be the first to solve the current 10 minute block, yielding them a reward in bitcoins. A transition to the proof-of-stake protocol, which has better energy efficiency, has been described as a sustainable alternative to bitcoin's protocol and as a potential solution to its environmental issues. Bitcoin advocates oppose such a change, arguing that proof of work is needed to secure the network.

Bitcoin mining's distribution makes it difficult for researchers to identify the location of miners and electricity use. It is therefore difficult to translate energy consumption into carbon emissions. As of 2025, the Cambridge Centre for Alternative Finance (CCAF) estimated that bitcoin consumed 138 TWh (500 PJ) annually, representing 0.5% of the world's electricity consumption and resulting in annual greenhouse gas emissions of 39.8 Mt CO_{2}, representing 0.08% of global emissions and comparable to Slovakia's emissions.

==== Bitcoin mining energy mix ====
Until 2021, most bitcoin mining was done in China. Chinese miners relied on cheap coal power in Xinjiang and Inner Mongolia during late autumn, winter and spring, migrating to regions with overcapacities in low-cost hydropower (like Sichuan and Yunnan) between May and October. After China banned bitcoin mining in June 2021, its mining operations moved to other countries. By August 2021, mining was concentrated in the U.S. (35%), Kazakhstan (18%), and Russia (11%) instead. The shift from coal resources in China to coal resources in Kazakhstan increased bitcoin's carbon footprint, as Kazakhstani coal plants use hard coal, which has the highest carbon content of all coal types. Despite the ban, covert mining operations gradually came back to China, reaching 21% of global hashrate as of 2022.

As of 2025, a CCAF report based on a survey of 49 bitcoin-mining firms (about 48% of network hashrate at the time of data collection) reported their electricity mix as renewables (43%), natural gas (38%), nuclear (10%), and coal (9%). Analysis by the nonprofit tech company WattTime estimated that US miners consumed 54% fossil fuel-generated power. In 2023, Jamie Coutts, a crypto analyst writing for Bloomberg Terminal, said that renewables represented about half of global bitcoin mining sources.

==== Environmental effects of electricity use ====
A study in Scientific Reports found that from 2016 to 2021, each US dollar worth of mined bitcoin caused 35 cents worth of climate damage, compared to 95 for coal, 41 for gasoline, 33 for beef, and 4 for gold mining. A 2025 paper published in Nature Communications found that the 34 largest U.S. bitcoin mines consumed 32.3 TWh of electricity from Aug 2022 to July 2023, 33% more than Los Angeles. Fossil fuel power plants generated 85% of the increased electricity demand from these mines.

The European Securities and Markets Authority and the European Central Bank suggested that using renewable energy for mining may limit the availability of clean energy for the general population.

A 2025 study in Scientific Reports of ten major cryptocurrency-producing countries (2019–2022) found that Bitcoin mining's electricity use was linked to worse environmental sustainability. A larger share of renewables softened but did not eliminate these effects during the study period, and the impact on water use was limited. A 2025 study in Sustainable Development that used monthly data from 2015–2023 and DARDL/KRLS methods reported an association between higher Bitcoin-mining electricity use and worse environmental sustainability in an SDG-framed measure; the authors characterized this as a risk factor for sustainability goals. A 2025 life-cycle assessment in ACS Sustainable Chemistry & Engineering quantified Bitcoin's carbon, water, and land footprints, concluding that the network's resource consumption poses sustainability challenges and highlighting the need for technological advances and cleaner energy sources.

==== Comparison to other payment systems ====
In 2018 Nature Climate Change published a study on projections of Bitcoin growth authored by Camilo Mora and fellow researchers from the University of Hawaiʻi at Mānoa. The paper considered the potential effects on global CO_{2} emissions should Bitcoin eventually replace other cashless transactions, finding that the associated energy consumption of Bitcoin usage could potentially produce enough CO_{2} emissions to lead to a 2°C increase in global mean average temperature within 30 years under certain assumptions. Several subsequent papers contested the researchers' assumptions. Mora and fellow publishers of the original article defended their paper.

In a 2023 study published in Ecological Economics, researchers from the International Monetary Fund estimated that the global payment system represented about 0.2% of global electricity consumption, comparable to the consumption of Portugal or Bangladesh. For bitcoin, energy used is estimated around 500 kWh per transaction, compared to 0.001 kWh for credit cards (not including consumption from the merchant's bank, which receives the payment). Many bitcoin transactions are performed in batches, allow bitcoin to process more payments than the number of blockchain transactions suggests. For instance, in 2022, bitcoin processed 100 million transactions per year, representing 250 million payments.

OECD notes that a direct comparison between blockchains, which are an infrastructure technology, and the energy consumption of financial sector activity may not be an appropriate comparison.

=== Electronic waste ===
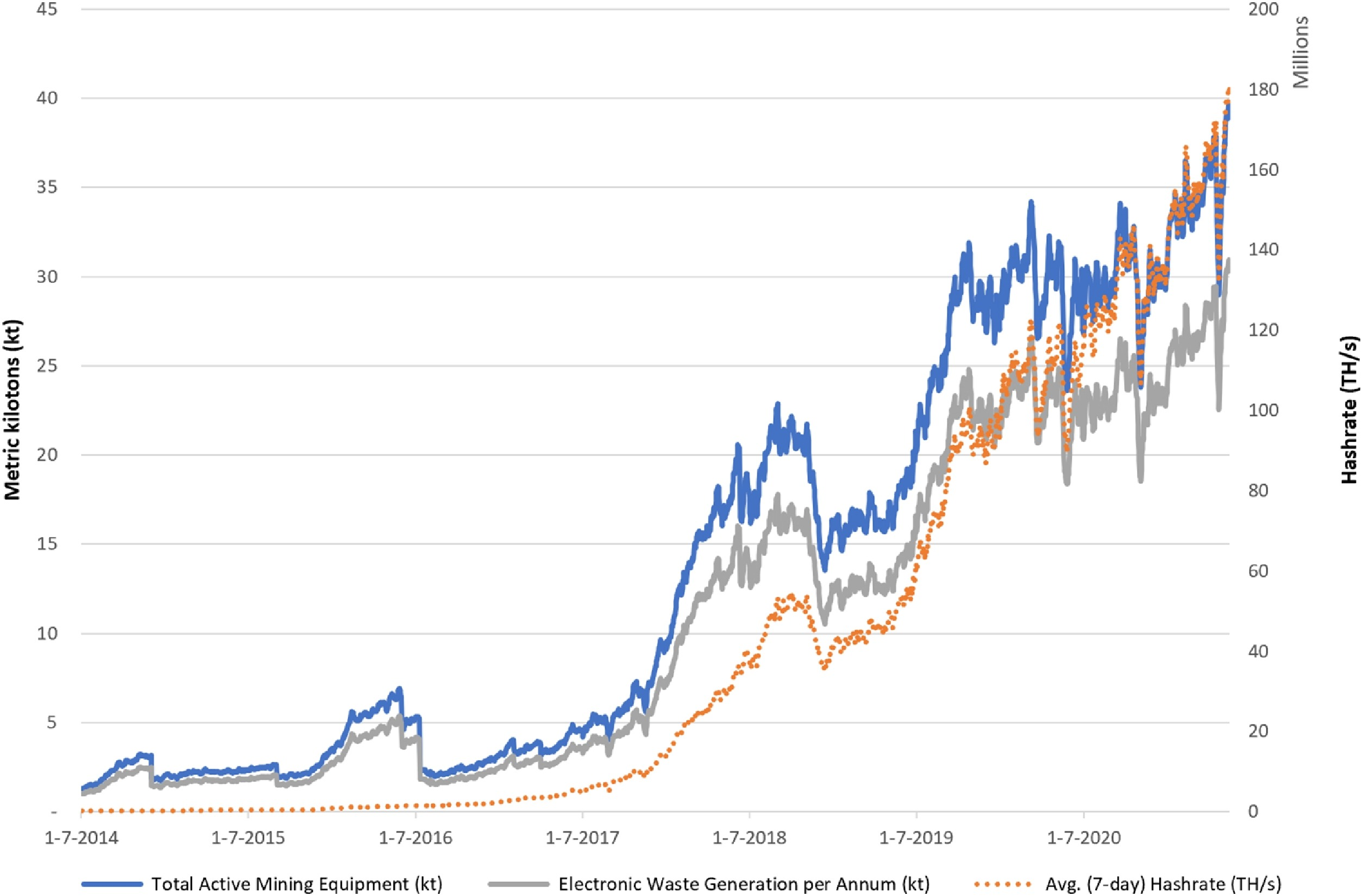
The total active mining equipment in the bitcoin network and the related electronic waste generation, from July 2014 to July 2021

Bitcoins are usually mined on specialized computing hardware, called application-specific integrated circuits, with no alternative use beyond bitcoin mining. Due to the consistent increase of the bitcoin network's hashrate, one 2021 study estimated that mining devices had an average lifespan of 1.3 years until they became unprofitable and had to be replaced, resulting in significant electronic waste. This study estimated bitcoin's annual e-waste to be over 30,000 tonnes (comparable to the small IT equipment waste produced by the Netherlands) and each transaction to result in 272 g (9.6 oz) of e-waste. A 2024 systematic review criticized this estimate and argued, based on market sales and IPO data, that bitcoin mining hardware lifespan was closer to 4–5 years. According to the CCAF, e-waste is significantly lower, estimated at 2,300 tonnes in 2024 as 87% of hardware is recycled, sold or repurposed.

=== Noise pollution ===
Field measurements around several large U.S. bitcoin mines show steady background sound in nearby residential areas commonly in the mid-30s to low-50s dBA, with higher levels closer to the mining facility. A 2024 consultant study commissioned by Hood County, Texas, measured background levels ranging from 35–53 dBA and recorded a maximum around 59 dBA at two neighborhood locations, while measurements near the site ranged 60–65 dBA. Separately, a 2022 Washington Post investigation that logged ~19,750 one-minute readings outside homes near a North Carolina cryptomine found sound levels above 55 dBA in 98% of readings and above 60 dBA in over 30% of readings. Mitigation approaches reported by operators and consultants include acoustic barriers, equipment enclosures, optimized fan controls, and immersion cooling; however, effectiveness and adoption vary by site.

=== Water footprint ===
According to a 2023 commentary in Cell Reports Sustainability, bitcoin's water footprint reached 1,600 gigalitres (5.7×10^{10} cu ft) in 2021, due to direct water consumption on site and indirect consumption from electricity generation. The author notes that this water footprint could be mitigated by using immersion cooling and power sources that do not require freshwater such as wind, solar, and thermoelectric power generation with dry cooling.

=== Land footprint ===
A 2023 study in Earth's Future estimated the global land-use footprint attributable to bitcoin mining in 2020–2021 at 1,870 km^{2} (720 mi^{2}), about 1.4 times the area of Los Angeles.

=== Health and local air pollution ===
A 2025 study in Nature Communications found that the demand from 34 large U.S. bitcoin mines increased PM2.5 pollution and exposed about 1.9 million people to ≥0.1 μg/m^{3} additional PM2.5, sometimes far from the mines. A 2024 review in Environmental Research linked proof-of-work mining to higher air pollution and potential health risks, calling for mitigation and better data. A 2024 JAMA Viewpoint described potential community hazards from cryptocurrency mining, including air and noise pollution, and recommended protections for vulnerable groups. One 2020 paper found that, in 2018, each US$1 of bitcoin created was associated with about US$0.49 in combined health and climate damages in the United States (US$0.37 in China). A 2024 analysis estimated the climate and health damages from U.S. mining during 2019–2021 exceeded the value of coins generated in many geographic hotspots.

== Proposed environmental mitigations ==
Government and intergovernmental reports discussed ways in which the environmental impact of crypto-asset mining might be reduced. The OECD examined renewable-energy use, flexible mining demand for grid balancing, and other technologies that could support climate transition, but concludes that renewable-energy use alone is insufficient to curb the negative environmental externalities of crypto-asset mining. The U.S. Office of Science and Technology Policy discussed flexible electricity demand, the use of vented methane, and curtailed renewable electricity, and discussed how this could reduce environmental impact or support electricity grids.

A 2025 book on environmental impacts of bitcoin mining reviews efforts involving increased use of renewable energy, use as a large curtailable load to help stabilize electricity grids, and perhaps expand renewables. It noted, however, that past efficiency gains had not reduced aggregate energy consumption.

=== Renewable energy and grid flexibility ===
Bitcoin mining has been proposed by advocates as a way to incentivize the expansion of clean energy operations. According to Time in 2022, most experts they had spoken with "dispute the idea that there has been any sort of boom in renewables due to crypto". In a March 2022 article in The New York Times, David Yaffe-Bellany describes efforts within the industry to promote clean energy. This was in response to a backlash from environmentalists and the general public to the industry's increasing rate of carbon emissions.

According to a 2023 paper in ACS Sustainable Chemistry & Engineering, bitcoin mining may offer opportunities to support the renewable-energy transition by using otherwise-curtailed renewable-energy and acting as a flexible electricity load. A 2023 article published in Resource and Energy Economics concluded that bitcoin mining could increase renewable capacity in the Texas grid, but that this would not necessarily decrease total carbon emissions. Studies from 2023 and 2024 led by Fengqi You propose that mining bitcoin off-grid during the pre-commercial phase (when a wind or solar farm is generating electricity but not yet integrated into the grid) could fund renewable energy development, including green hydrogen, and thereof assist in climate change mitigation. A 2024 study published in Heliyon simulated that a solar-powered bitcoin mining system could achieve a return on investment in 3.5 years compared to 8.1 years for selling electricity to the grid. The authors of the Heliyon study note that proof-of-stake cryptocurrencies cannot provide these incentives.

=== Methane waste electricity generation ===
Bitcoin mining has also generated electricity from associated petroleum gas (APG), which is a methane-rich byproduct of crude oil drilling that is sometimes flared or released into the atmosphere, exacerbating the greenhouse gas effect. Methane is a greenhouse gas with a global warming potential 28 to 36 times greater than CO_{2}. Environmental researcher Peter Howson disputed this framing saying that using flared methane for bitcoin mining can make fossil-fuel companies more profitable, slowing the transition to cleaner alternatives. According to a 2024 paper published in the Journal of Cleaner Production, bitcoin mining can finance methane mitigation of landfill gases.

=== Waste coal use ===
In Western Pennsylvania, the bitcoin mining company Stronghold Digital Mining has described its use of waste coal to power bitcoin mining as environmental remediation. Stronghold Digital Mining removes coal ash from abandoned coal mining sites to power their miners. Coal ash is a form of coal waste that pollutes the groundwater and contains heavy metals. The Pennsylvania government provides tax credits to firms that are able to remove the hazardous waste. Existing coal ash is highly combustible and prone to uncontrolled burning. The company collects the coal ash and processes it so it can be burned, which puts proportionately more Co2 into the atmosphere than burning clean coal would. The company reported removing 240,000 tons of waste in the second quarter of 2022, although the company was not profitable that quarter, and most of its profit was from selling energy back to the grid instead of from mining bitcoin. Rob Altenburg of PennFuture told WESA that using waste coal as fuel does not eliminate pollution, but shifts pollution from land and water to the air. In 2024, the environmental group Save Carbon County sued Stronghold Digital Mining and Pennsylvania, alleging that a bitcoin mine in northeastern Pennsylvania that burned waste coal and old tires for energy polluted nearby communities with mercury, sulfur dioxide, and other dangerous chemicals.

=== Waste heat use ===
Bitcoin mining has been proposed for use in agriculture, such as greenhouse operations, where bitcoin mining waste heat could be repurposed to reduce energy costs and the environmental impact of both industries. In a 2025 study in Applied Energy, W.H. Chen & Fengqi You simulations of using bitcoin mining to heat greenhouses are used for a framework for "optimizing energy use and reducing greenhouse gas emissions in agricultural operations."

== Regulatory responses ==
China's 2021 bitcoin mining ban was partly motivated by its role in illegal coal mining and environmental concerns.

In September 2022, the US Office of Science and Technology Policy highlighted the need for increased transparency about electricity usage, greenhouse gas emissions, and e-waste. In November 2022, the US Environmental Protection Agency confirmed working on the climate impacts of cryptocurrency mining. In the US, New York State banned new fossil fuel mining plants with a two-year moratorium, citing environmental concerns, while Iowa, Kentucky, Montana, Pennsylvania, Rhode Island, Texas, and Wyoming encourage bitcoin mining with tax breaks. Texas incentives aim to cut methane emissions from flared gas using bitcoin mining. In January 2024, the US Energy Information Administration launched a mandatory survey of cryptocurrency miner energy use but suspended it one month later after it was successfully challenged by miners before the United States District Court for the Western District of Texas.

In Canada, due to high demand from the industry and concerned that their renewable electricity could be better used, the provinces Manitoba and British Columbia paused new connections of bitcoin mining facilities to the hydroelectric grid in late 2022 for 18 months while Hydro-Québec increased prices and capped usage for bitcoin miners.

In October 2022, due to the global energy crisis, the European Commission invited member states to lower the electricity consumption of crypto-asset miners and end tax breaks and other incentives benefiting them.

== See also ==
- Environmental impact of artificial intelligence
- Environmental impact of computers – Environmentally sustainable computing and information technology
