= SolverStudio =

Excel plug-in

SolverStudio is a free Excel plug-in developed at the University of Auckland that supports optimization and simulation modelling in a spreadsheet using an algebraic modeling language. It is popular in education, the public sector and industry for optimization users because it uses industry-standard modelling languages and is faster than traditional Excel optimisation approaches.

SolverStudio adds a text editor to Excel that is used to create a text-based optimization (or simulation) model using a modelling language such as PuLP, AMPL, GAMS or Julia/JuMP. SolverStudio also provides a tool for naming data on a spreadsheet (and specifying indices for this data), allowing the data to be used in the model. When the model is run, the system automatically reads input data from the spreadsheet and provides it to the model, and then writes the model results back to the spreadsheet.

SolverStudio works with a range of commercial and open source modelling systems. By default, it uses PuLP, an open-source Python COIN-OR modelling language. A second open-source Python option is Pyomo which supports non-linear and stochastic programming and provides access to a larger range of solvers. Another supported linear and non-linear modelling option is Julia/JuMP.

SolverStudio also makes the two popular commercial modelling languages, AMPL and GAMS available to Excel users. SolverStudio allows models written using these languages to be solved on the user's own PC, or in the cloud using NEOS.

The GNU clone of AMPL, GMPL (GNU MathProg Language) is included with SolverStudio.

SolverStudio includes the open-source COIN-OR CMPL modelling language, and the Python-based SimPy simulation language. SolverStudio supports general programming using both Python and IronPython, allowing these programming languages to be used to script Excel using the standard VBA interfaces.
