= Mathematics Genealogy Project =

Web-based database for the academic genealogy of mathematicians

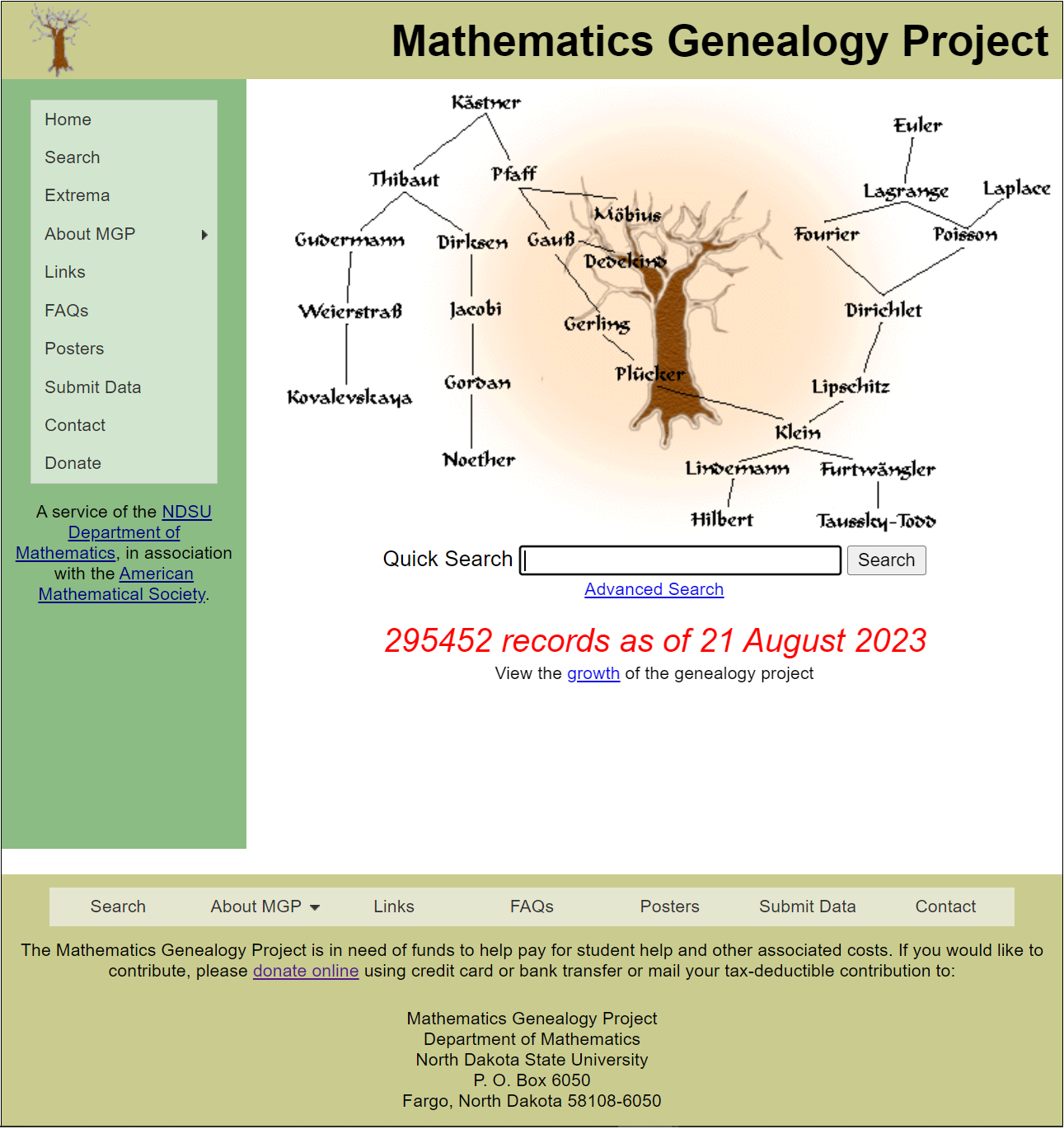
- Home page, 2023
- Website type: academic genealogy
- Available in: English
- Owners: Minnesota State University (1997–2002); North Dakota State University (2003–present)
- Creator: Harry Coonce
- Key people: Mitchel T. Keller
- Website: mathgenealogy.org
- Commercial: No
- Launched: October 1997; 28 years ago

The Mathematics Genealogy Project (MGP) is a web-based database for the academic genealogy of mathematicians. As of 30 September 2025, it contained information on 334,029 mathematical scientists who contributed to research-level mathematics. For a typical mathematician, the project entry includes graduation year, thesis title (in its Mathematics Subject Classification), alma mater, doctoral advisor, and doctoral students.

== Origin of the database ==
The project grew out of founder Harry Coonce's desire to know the name of his advisor's advisor. Coonce was Professor of Mathematics at Minnesota State University, Mankato, at the time of the project's founding, and the project went online there in the autumn of 1997. Coonce retired from Mankato in 1999, and in the autumn of 2002 the university decided that it would no longer support the project. The project relocated at that time to North Dakota State University. Since 2003, the project has also operated under the auspices of the American Mathematical Society and in 2005 it received a grant from the Clay Mathematics Institute. Harry Coonce was assisted by Mitchel T. Keller, Assistant Professor at Morningside College. Keller is currently the managing director of the project.

== Mission and scope ==
The Mathematics Genealogy Mission statement: "Throughout this project when we use the word 'mathematics' or 'mathematician' we mean that word in a very inclusive sense. Thus, all relevant data from statistics, computer science, philosophy or operations research is welcome."

The genealogy information is obtained from sources such as Dissertation Abstracts International and Notices of the American Mathematical Society, but may be supplied by anyone via the project's website. The searchable database contains the name of the mathematician, university which awarded the degree, year when the degree was awarded, title of the dissertation, names of the advisor and second advisor, a flag of the country where the degree was awarded, a listing of doctoral students, and a count of academic descendants. Some historically significant figures who lacked a doctoral degree are listed, notably Joseph-Louis Lagrange and Isaac Newton.

The oldest chronological entries in the project are Abu Sahl 'Isa ibn Yahya al-Masihi (who died c. 1010) and his student Ibn Sina, commonly known in the West as Avicenna. They each have, as of September 2026, more than 245,000 descendants in the genealogy.

== Reliability and completeness ==
It has been noted that "the data collected by the mathematics genealogy project are self-reported, so there is no guarantee that the observed genealogy network is a complete description of the mentorship network. In fact, 16,147 mathematicians do not have a recorded mentor, and of these, 8,336 do not have any recorded proteges." Maimgren, Ottino and Amaral (2010) stated that "for [mathematicians who graduated between 1900 and 1960] we believe that the graduation and mentorship record is the most reliable."

== See also ==
- Neurotree, Academic Family Tree
