= Institute for Computational Sustainability =

- Established: 2008
- Field of research: Computational sustainability
- Director: Carla P. Gomes
- Campus: Cornell University (primary)
- Website: computational-sustainability.cis.cornell.edu

The Institute for Computational Sustainability (ICS), founded in 2008 with support from an Expeditions in Computing grant from the National Science Foundation, focuses on the newly emerging field of computational sustainability and aims to apply computational techniques to help solve challenging sustainability problems. Its vision is that "computer scientists can—and should—play a key role in increasing the efficiency and effectiveness in the way we manage and allocate our natural resources, while enriching and transforming Computer Science." The institute, headed by Carla Gomes, is a joint venture involving scientists from Cornell University, Bowdoin College, the Conservation Fund, Howard University, Oregon State University, and the Pacific Northwest National Laboratory.

== Research team ==
The institute's research team is highly interdisciplinary, bringing together computer scientists, biologists, environmental scientists, biological and environmental engineers, mathematicians, and economists from 7 different colleges, in 12 different departments. The team is led by:

- Carla P. Gomes, Cornell University (Director ICS)
- David Shmoys, Cornell University (Associate Director ICS)
- Thomas Dietterich, Oregon State University (Deputy Director ICS (OSU))
- Mary Lou Zeeman, Bowdoin College (Deputy Director ICS (Bowdoin))

== Expedition goals ==
The NSF Expeditions in Computing grant supporting ICS has the following goals:

- To inject Computational Thinking into Sustainability that will provide:
  - new insights into sustainability questions;
  - new challenges and new methodologies in Computer Science (analogous to Computational Biology).
- To establish a new field, Computational Sustainability:
  - Focused on computational methods for balancing environmental, economic, and societal needs for a sustainable future.
- To establish the Institute for Computational Sustainability (ICS) in order to:
  - Perform and foster research in Computational Sustainability
  - Establish a vibrant research community, reaching far beyond the participating members of this Expedition.

== NSF support ==
The National Science Foundation announced in 2008 that it has established a five-year program to support research in the field of computational sustainability. Quoting from their Press Release 08-141:

August 18, 2008

The Directorate for Computer and Information Science and Engineering (CISE) at the National Science Foundation (NSF) has established four new Expeditions in Computing. Each of these $10 million grants will allow teams of researchers and educators to pursue far-reaching research agendas that promise significant advances in the computing frontier and great benefit to society.

...

In the Expedition Computational Sustainability: Computational Methods for a Sustainable Environment, Economy, and Society, Carla Gomes and her colleagues at Cornell University, Bowdoin College, the Conservation Fund, Howard University, Oregon State University and the Pacific Northwest National Laboratory will explore the development and application of computational methods to enable a sustainable environment, economy and society. By tackling challenges that have not traditionally been addressed by computational approaches, Gomes and her team hope to create a new field of computational sustainability—much like computational biology has arisen in past decades—that will stimulate new research synergies across the areas of constraint optimization, dynamical systems, and machine learning. The research team is highly interdisciplinary, bringing together computer scientists, applied mathematicians, economists, biologists and environmental scientists.
