= Jay H. Lee =

South Korean academic

- Education: California Institute of Technology and University of Washington
- Awards: National Science Foundation Young Investigator Award, Tech Ziegler Award, ISMI Best Paper Award and Korean Academy of Science and Technology

Jay Hyung Lee (Korean: 이재형) is a professor at Department of Chemical and Biomolecular Engineering in KAIST (Korea Advanced Institute of Science and Technology). His h-index is 55 according to Google Scholar. Lee was a professor at Georgia Institute of Technology in the United States from 2000 to 2010. Lee is a fellow of Institute of Electrical and Electronics Engineers (IEEE). He is an editor of Computers & Chemical Engineering journal.
