= Department of Chemical Engineering, Imperial College London =

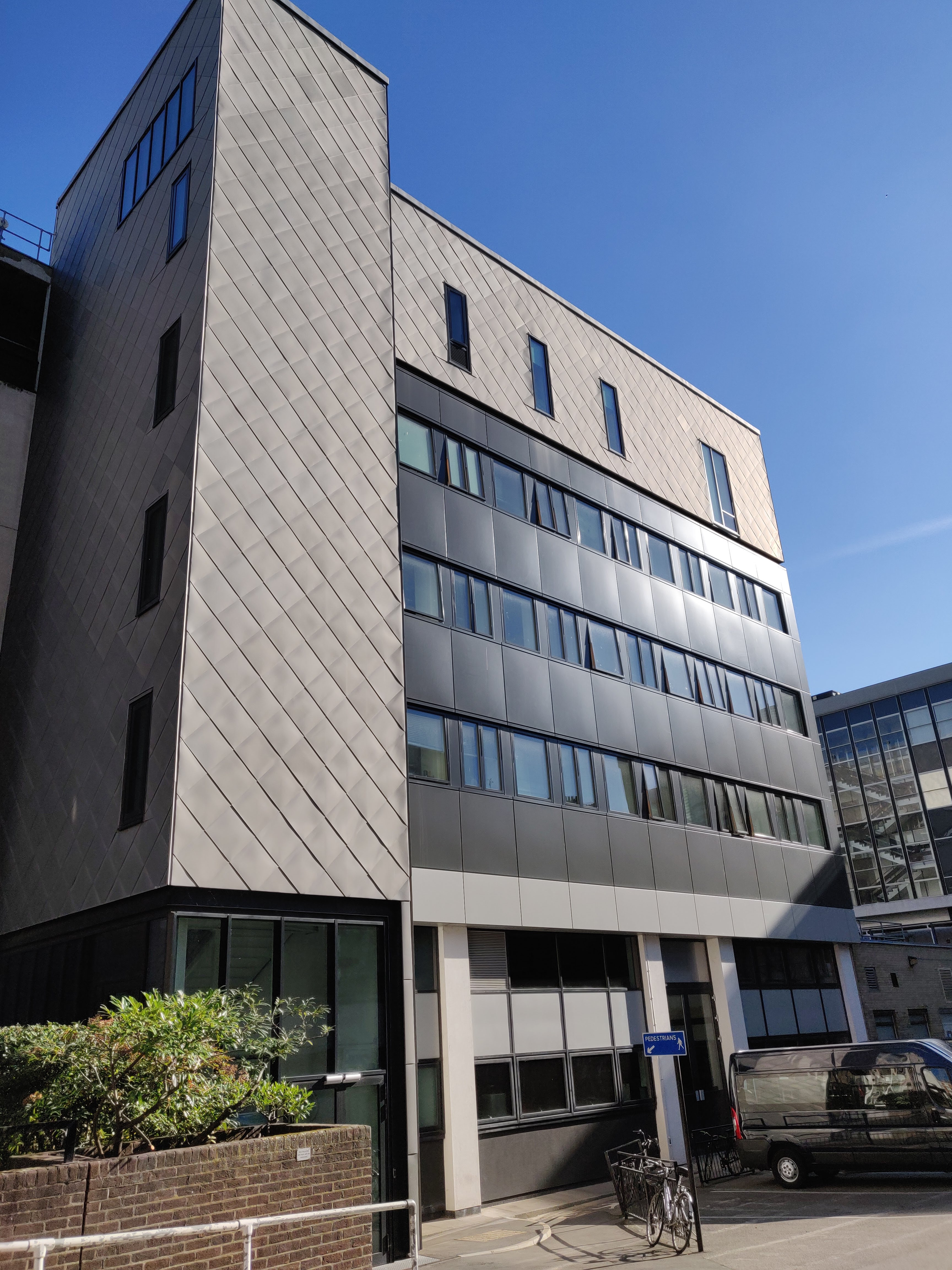
- The Aeronautics and Chemical Engineering Extension as seen from Callendar Road
- Established: 1912
- Head of Department: Professor Nilay Shah
- Faculty: Imperial College Faculty of Engineering
- Staff: 43
- Students: 857
- Location: London, United Kingdom; 51.499137°N 0.177630°W
- Campus: South Kensington
- Website: www.imperial.ac.uk/chemical-engineering

Map
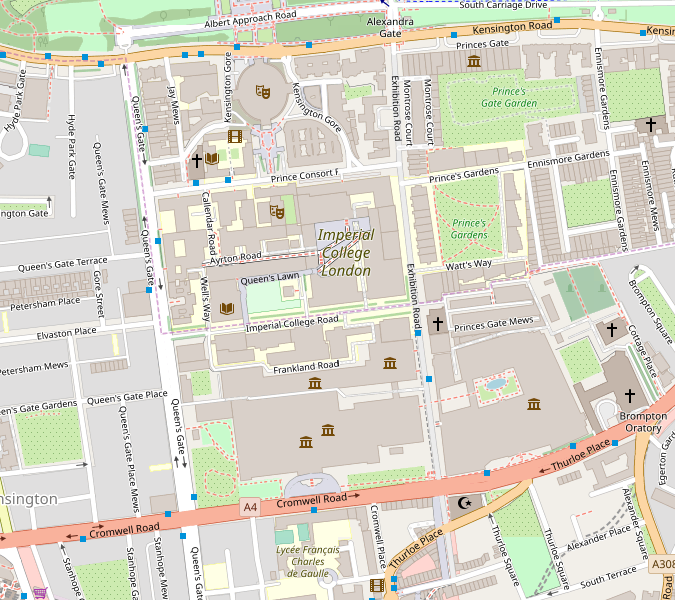
- Location within Albertopolis, South Kensington

The Department of Chemical Engineering is an academic department of the Faculty of Engineering at Imperial College London in England, United Kingdom.

It is located the Aeronautics and Chemical Engineering Extension (ACEX), Bone and Roderic Hill buildings, on the South Kensington campus. Formally inaugurated in 1912, the department has over 40 faculty members, 100 postdoctoral researchers, 200 PhD researchers, 80 taught postgraduates, and 500 undergraduates. The department ranks 7th on QS's 2018 world rankings.

== History ==
Following the grant of a royal charter for the formation of Imperial College in 1907, a Department of Chemical Technology was proposed in 1908 and formally opened in the year 1912, housed within the Department of Chemistry in the Royal College of Science. Professor William Bone was appointed the first head of the department and oversaw the construction of the new building on Prince Consort Road to house it. In 1931, the first postgraduate course in chemical engineering began, followed in 1937 by the first undergraduate degree in chemical engineering. The first four-year undergraduate degrees were established in 1980 and in 1989, Professor Roger W. H. Sargent founded the Centre for Process Systems Engineering in the department. In 2003, the first MSc in advanced chemical engineering was introduced.

== Facilities ==
The department has a variety of labs and facilities in the Aeronautics and Chemical Engineering Extension building, including an analytical services lab with more than 20 major instruments, a mechanical workshop to design and manufacture prototype equipment and the college's Carbon Capture Pilot Plant. The £2 million Carbon Capture Pilot Plant, which opened in 2012, is housed in the department and is the most sophisticated of its kind in an academic institution in the world.

== Academics ==
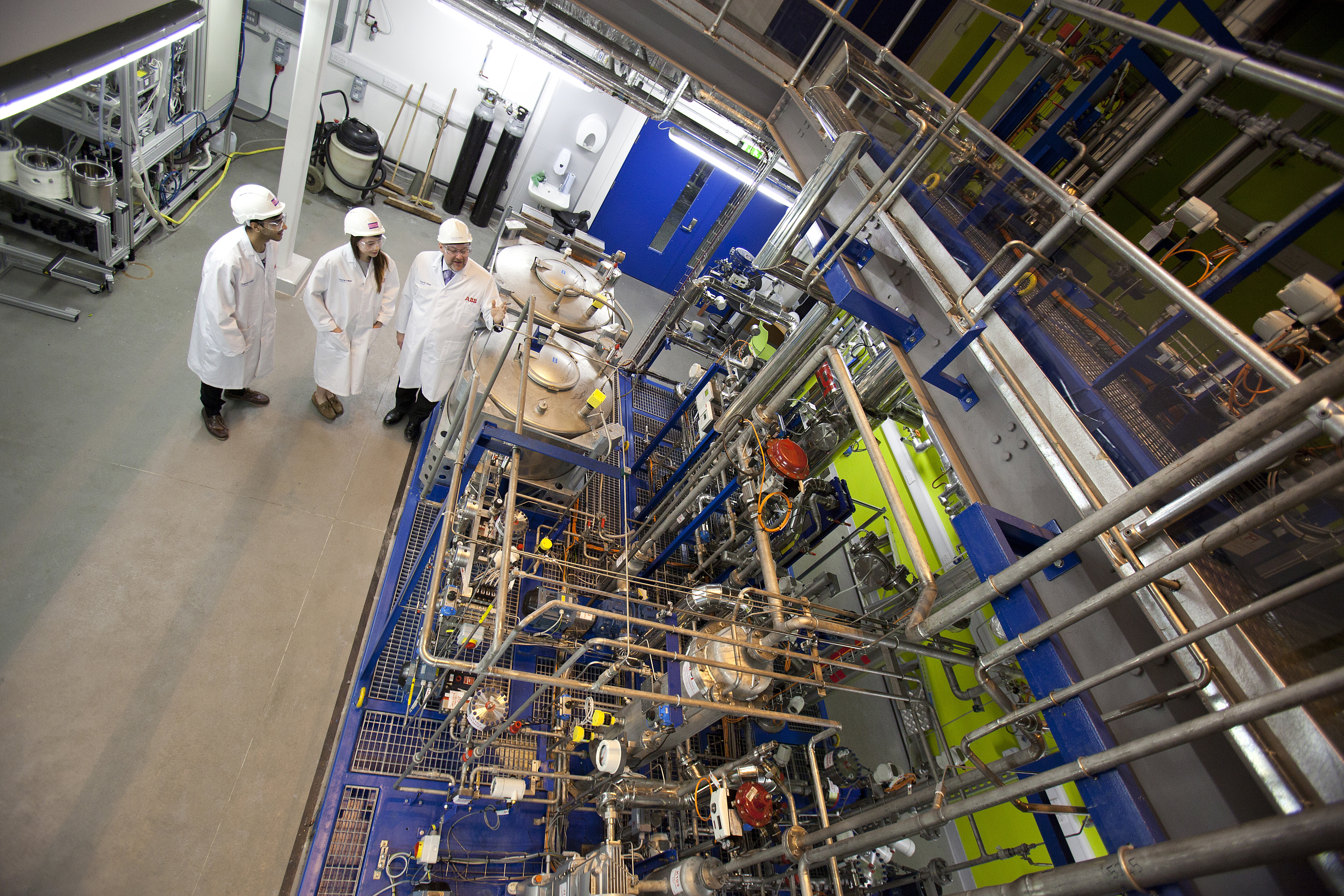
The department runs the college's Carbon Capture Pilot Plant

=== Study ===
==== Undergraduate ====
The undergraduate program at the department is a 4-year integrated course leading to an MEng degree in chemical engineering, including an option to study a year abroad. There is also the option of a specialist stream in lllNuclear lllEngineering (delivered jointly with the Department of Materials and Mechanical Engineering). All students graduating with the MEng degree also automatically receive an lllAssociateship of the City and Guilds of London Institute.

==== Postgraduate ====
The department has a large research portfolio and offers a PhD degree programme, four full-time MSc programmes and one part-time course. The PhD in lllChemical lllEngineering is a 3-year research degree which involves conducting work in one of the department's research laboratories, the Centre for Process Systems Engineering or the Qatar Carbonates and Carbon Storage Research Centre. All postgraduate students of the department are also eligible for the Diploma of Imperial College, DIC, alongside their standard degree when graduating.

=== Rankings ===
The college ranks 10th in the world for engineering on the Times Higher Education subject rankings, and the department in particular ranks tied 7th in the world (along with Caltech), and 3rd in the UK after Cambridge and Oxford, on the QS World University Rankings. Domestically, the department ranks 3rd on the Complete University Guide's 2019 chemical engineering table, and 4th on The Guardian's 2019 chemical engineering university subject rankings.

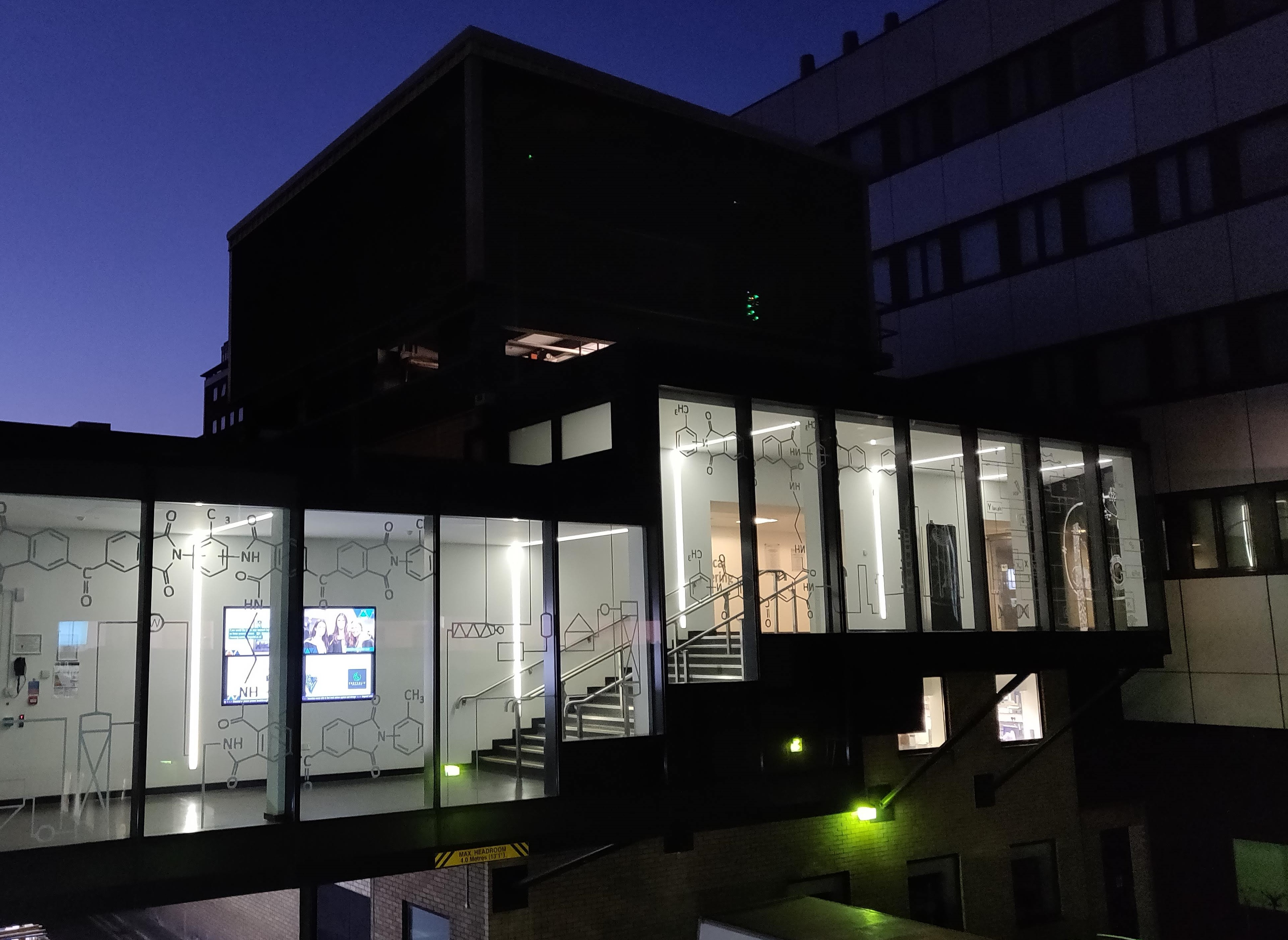
The department from the college's main walkway

== Notable alumni ==
- William A. Bone FRS – Head of the department from 1912 to 1936 and renowned fuel technologist and chemist.
- Sir Alfred Egerton FRS – Professor of chemical technology at Imperial College London from 1936 to 1952 and secretary of the Royal Society from 1938 to 1948.
- John Coulson – Achieved his PhD from the department in 1935 and joined the academic staff thereafter, achieving the status of Reader. He is best known as the co-author of the textbook Coulson and Richardson's Chemical Engineering along with Jack Richardson.
- Jack Richardson – A BSc student of chemical engineering at the department, Jack Richardson achieved his PhD in 1949 before joining the academic staff where he would later become senior lecturer. He is best known for his co-authorship of the Coulson and Richardson's Chemical Engineering series of books along with John Coulson.
- Dudley Newitt FRS – Head of Department from 1952 to 1961. He served as the scientific director of the Special Operations Executive during the Second World War developing espionage technology for the British Government.
- Alfred Ubbelohde FRS – Head of the department from 1961 to 1975. Author of six books and over 400 publications, the Ubbelohde effect (the increase in hydrogen bond length due to deuteration) is named after him. He is also credited with coining the term proton conductor.
- Roger W.H. Sargent FREng – Head of the department from 1975 to 1988. Widely regarded as the father of Process Systems Engineering due to his research and widespread influence on the field. He was a Founder Fellow of the Royal Academy of Engineering in 1976.
- Sir William Wakeham – Head of the department from 1988 to 1996 and chair of the Resource Audit Committee of the Engineering and Physical Sciences Research Council (EPSRC).
- Dame Julia Higgins FRS FREng – Acting Head of the department from 2000 to 2001 and continuing Emeritus Professor and Senior Research Investigator. Widely known for her studies on polymer molecules with many breakthroughs in the field. She is also held in high esteem for her efforts in the advancement of women in the field of science engineering and technology. The Julia Higgins Medal and Awards at Imperial College London is named after her.
- Dame Judith Hackitt FREng – A graduate from the department in 1975. She is currently the chair of the Health and Safety Executive of the United Kingdom.
- Iain Conn – A graduate from the department, he is currently the CEO of Centrica and former Group Executive Office of BP from 2004 to 2014.
- Ian Read – A graduate from the department in 1974, Ian Read served as the CEO of Pfizer from 2010 to 2019.
