= Computational sustainability =

Computational sustainability is an emerging field that attempts to balance societal, economic, and environmental resources for the future well-being of humanity using methods from mathematics, computer science, and information science fields. Sustainability in this context refers to the world's ability to sustain biological, social, and environmental systems in the long term.

Using the power of computers to process large quantities of information, decision making algorithms allocate resources based on real-time information. Applications advanced by this field are widespread across various areas. For example, artificial intelligence and machine learning techniques are created to promote long-term biodiversity conservation and species protection. Smart grids implement renewable resources and storage capabilities to control the production and expenditure of energy. Intelligent transportation system technologies can analyze road conditions and relay information to drivers so they can make smarter, more environmentally-beneficial decisions based on real-time traffic information.

== Origins and motivations ==
The field of computational sustainability has been motivated by Our Common Future, a 1987 report from the World Commission on Environment and Development about the future of humanity. More recently, computational sustainability research has also been driven by the United Nations' Sustainable Development Goals, a set of 17 goals for the sustainability of human economic, social, and environmental well-being world-wide. Researchers in computational sustainability have primarily focused on addressing problems in areas related to the environment (e.g., biodiversity conservation), sustainable energy infrastructure and natural resources, and societal aspects (e.g., global hunger crises). The computational aspects of computational sustainability leverage techniques from mathematics and computer science, in the areas of artificial intelligence, machine learning, algorithms, game theory, mechanism design, information science, optimization (including combinatorial optimization), dynamical systems, and multi-agent systems.

== Biodiversity and conservation ==
Computational sustainability researchers have advanced techniques to combat the biodiversity loss facing the world during the current sixth extinction. Researchers have created computational methods for geospatially mapping the distribution, migration patterns, and wildlife corridors of species, which enable scientists to quantify conservation efforts and recommend effective policies.

In addition to scientific research contributions, the computational sustainability community has also contributed technologies that support citizen science conservation initiatives. An example is the creation of eBird, which enables citizens to share sightings of birds and crowd-source the creation of a global bird distribution database for researchers. An example of successful application of eBird database is the Nature Conservancy's Bird Returns program (2013), where farmers are compensated for their effort of maintaining suitable habitats for birds during the migratory periods. Another example is iNaturalist which enables citizens to crowd-source the creation of databases about animals, plants, and other organisms, to support scientific research.

== Transportation ==
Intelligent Transportation Systems (ITS) seek to improve safety and travel times while minimizing greenhouse gas emissions for all travelers, though focusing mainly on drivers. ITS has two systems: one for data collection/relaying, and another for data processing. Data collection can be achieved with video cameras over busy areas, sensors that detect various pieces from location of certain vehicles to infrastructure that's breaking down, and even drivers who notice an accident and use a mobile app, like Waze, to report its whereabouts.

Advanced Public Transportation Systems (APTS) aim to make public transportation more efficient and convenient for its riders. Electronic payment methods allow users to add money to their smart cards at stations and online. APTS relay information to transit facilities about current vehicle locations to give riders expected wait times on screens at stations and directly to customers' smart phones. Advanced Traffic Management Systems (ATMS) collect information using cameras and other sensors that gather information regarding how congested roads are. Ramp meters regulate the number of cars entering highways to limit backups. Traffic signals use algorithms to optimize travel times depending on the number of cars on the road. Electronic highway signs relay information regarding travel times, detours, and accidents that may affect drivers ability to reach their destination.

With the rise of consumer connectivity, less infrastructure is needed for these ITS to make informed decisions. Google Maps uses smartphone crowdsourcing to get information about real-time traffic conditions allowing motorists to make decisions based on toll roads, travel times, and overall distance traveled. Cars communicate with their manufacturers to remotely install software updates when new features are added or bugs are being patched. Tesla Motors even uses these updates to increase their cars efficiency and performance. These connections give ITS a means to accurately collect information and even relay that information to drivers with no other infrastructure needed.

Future ITS systems will aid in car communication with not just the infrastructure, but with other cars as well.

== Utilities ==
The electrical grid was designed to send consumers electricity from electricity generators for a monthly fee based on usage. Homeowners are installing solar panels and large batteries to store the power created by these panels. A smart grid is being created to accommodate the new energy sources. Rather than just electricity being sent to a household to be consumed by the various appliances in the home, electricity can flow in either direction. Additional sensors along the grid will improve information collection and decreased downtime during power outages. These sensors can also relay information directly to consumers about how much energy they're using and what the costs will be.

== See also ==
- Carla Gomes, pioneer of computational sustainability
- Environmental informatics
- eBird
- Green computing
- Institute for Computational Sustainability (ICS)
- The Nature Conservancy
- United States Fish and Wildlife Service
- United States Geological Survey
