= Academic Family Tree =

Online database for academic genealogy

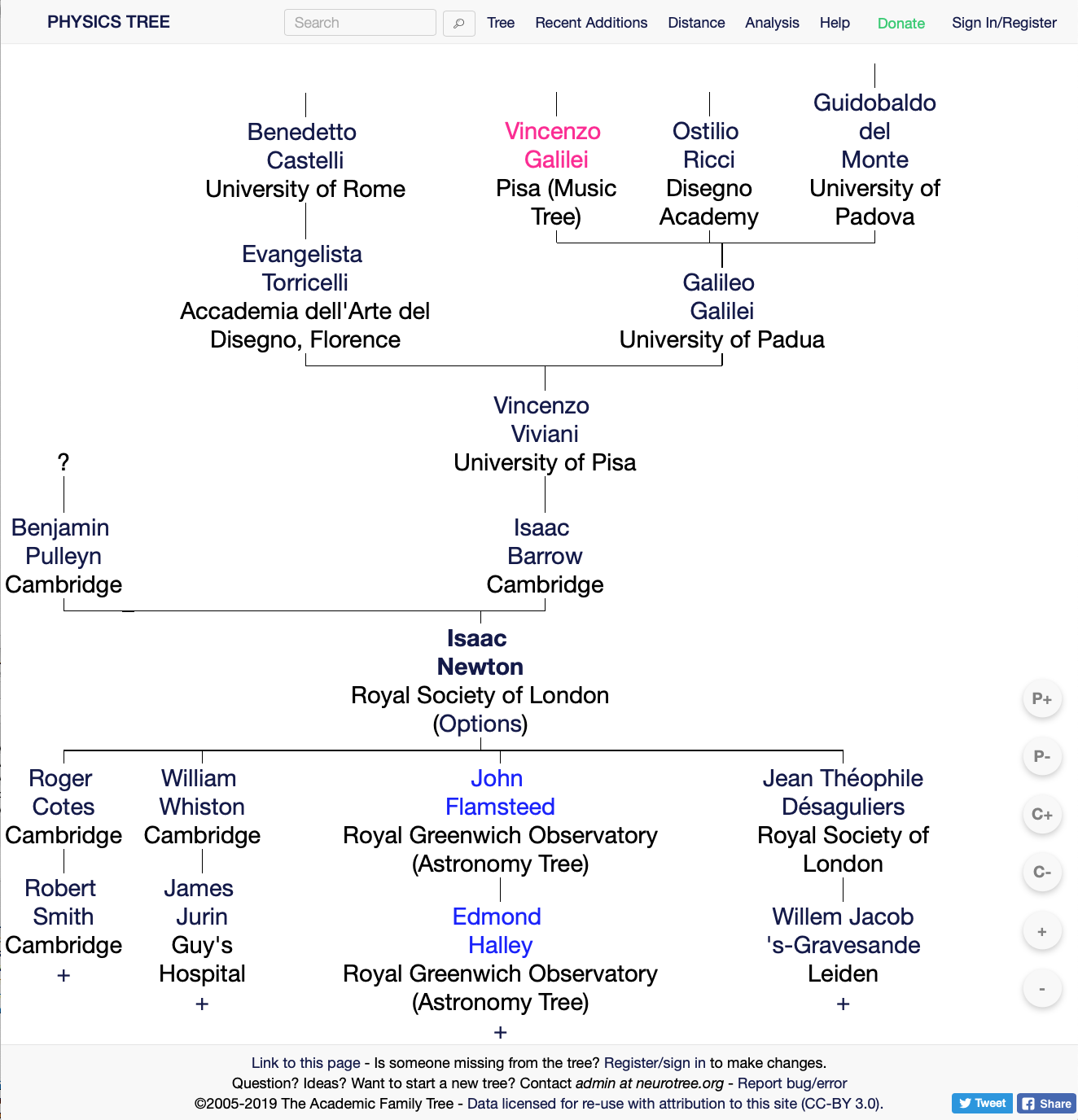
An example of part of an academic genealogy, a family tree, from Academic Family Tree (in this case from the Physics Tree), of four generations of Isaac Newton's academic ancestors and two generations of his academic descendants

The Academic Family Tree, which began as Neurotree, is an online database for academic genealogy, containing numerous "family trees" of academic disciplines. Neurotree was established in 2005 as a family tree of neuroscientists. Later that year Academic Family Tree incorporated Neurotree and family trees of other scholarly disciplines.

Unlike a conventional genealogy or family tree, in which connections among individuals are from kinship (e.g., parents to children), connections in Academic Family Tree are from mentoring relationships, usually among people working in academic settings (e.g., doctoral supervisors to students).

Academic Family Tree has been used as sources of information for the history and prospects of academic fields such as psychology, meteorology, organizational communication, and neuroscience. It has been used to address infometrics, to research issues of scientific methodology, and to examine mentor characteristics that predict mentee academic success.

== Functioning and scope ==
The founders of the initial trees, including Neurotree, populated them from published sources, such as ProQuest. Later, they set up discipline-specific family trees of Academic Family Tree to be volunteer-run; accuracy is maintained by a group of volunteer editors. Hierarchical connections between mentors ("parents") and mentees ("children") are defined as any meaningful mentoring relationship (research assistant, graduate student, postdoctoral fellow, or research scientist). Continuous records extend well into the Middle Ages and earlier.

As of 29 September 2023, Academic Family Tree contained 871,361 people with 882,278 connections among them.

Academic Family Tree encompasses a broad range of discipline-specific trees. As of 29 September 2023, there were 73 trees spanning science (e.g., human genetics, microbiology, and psychology), mathematics and philosophy, engineering, the humanities (e.g., economics, law, theology, and music), and business (e.g., organizational communication and advertising).

All trees within Academic Family Tree are closely linked. A search for a person in one tree gives hits from all trees in Academic Family Tree.

The data in Academic Family Tree are owned by the nonprofit academictree.org, but they are shared under the Creative Commons License (CC-BY 3.0). This means a person may use the data in any tree for any purpose as long as the source is cited.

== Tools ==
All trees under Academic Family Tree have a set of tools similar to those of conventional genealogy applications. One is Distance that allows a user to enter two scholars' names and to determine the number of degrees of separation between the two. For example, the number of degrees of academic separation between Isaac Newton and Marie Curie is 9 (including research assistantships, postdoctoral positions, and research scientist positions).

== History ==
Neurotree was founded in January 2005 by Stephen V. David, then an assistant professor in the Oregon Hearing Research Center of Oregon Health and Science University, and by Benjamin Y. Hayden, an assistant professor in the Department of Brain and Cognitive Sciences, Center for Visual Science, University of Rochester. David and Hayden founded Academic Family Tree soon after founding Neurotree.

In November 2014, David received funding for Neurotree from the Metaknowledge Network. In November 2016, David received funding for Academic Family Tree from the National Science Foundation (NSF) SciSIP Program. In July 2019, David again received funding for Neurotree from the NSF.

Marsh (2017) pointed out that information for Neurotree and Academic Family Tree is provided by volunteers and it is not formally peer-reviewed. She cautioned that this can mean their information is inaccurate.

=== Relation to other academic genealogies ===
One other notable discipline-specific academic genealogy is the Mathematics Genealogy Project. Academic Family Tree has its own mathematics tree, MathTree but it is much less complete than the Mathematics Genealogy Project. As of 29 September 2023, MathTree contained 35,817 people whereas the Mathematics Genealogy Project contained 297,268 people.

One other general academic genealogy was PhD Tree. PhD Tree ceased functioning some time after June 2017.

== See also ==
- Mathematics Genealogy Project
