= Academic genealogy =

Links between academics based on mentorships

An example of an academic genealogy, the supervisorial relationship between Dutch topologist Johannes De Groot and his namesake, also a Dutch topologist descended from the senior De Groot via four different paths of academic supervision

An academic genealogy (or scientific genealogy) organizes a family tree of scientists and scholars according to mentoring relationships, often in the form of dissertation supervision relationships, and not according to genetic relationships as in conventional genealogy. Since the term academic genealogy has now developed this specific meaning, its additional use to describe a more academic approach to conventional genealogy would be ambiguous, so the description scholarly genealogy is now generally used in the latter context.

== Overview ==
The academic lineage or academic ancestry of someone is a chain of professors who have served as academic mentors or thesis advisors of each other, ending with the person in question. Many genealogical terms are often recast in terms of academic lineages, so one may speak of academic descendants, children, siblings, etc. One method of developing an academic genealogy is to organize individuals by prioritizing their degree of relationship to a mentor/advisor as follows: (1). doctoral students, (2). post-doctoral researchers, (3). master's students and (4). current students, including undergraduate researchers.

Through the 19th century, particularly for graduates in sciences such as chemistry, it was common to have completed a degree in medicine or pharmacy before continuing with post-graduate or post-doctoral studies. Until the early 20th century, attaining professorial status or mentoring graduate students did not necessarily require a doctorate or graduate degree.

Websites such as the Mathematics Genealogy Project or the Chemical Genealogy document academic lineages for specific subject areas, while some other sites, such as Neurotree and Academic Family Tree aim to provide a complete academic genealogy across all fields of academia.

== Influence ==
Academic genealogy may influence research results in areas of active research. Hirshman et al. examined a controversial medical question, the value of maximal surgery for high grade glioma, and demonstrated that a physician's medical academic genealogy can affect his or her findings and approaches to treatment.
