= Efstratios N. Pistikopoulos =

Greek chemical engineer

- Born: Thessaloniki, Greece
- Citizenship: Greece, United States
- Education: Aristotle University of Thessaloniki; Carnegie Mellon University
- Occupation: Professor
- Known for: Multi-parametric programming, Model predictive control
- Scientific career
- Fields: Chemical Engineering
- Workplaces: Imperial College London, Texas A&M University
- Thesis: Systematic procedures to improve process flexibility in retrofit design (1988)
- Doctoral advisor: Ignacio Grossmann

Efstratios N. (Stratos) Pistikopoulos is a distinguished research professor at the Department of Chemical Engineering at Texas A&M University, as well as the director of the Texas A&M Energy Institute. From 1991-2015, he was a professor for chemical engineering at Imperial College, where he pioneered multi-parametric programming and invented the concept of explicit or multi-parametric model predictive control. He has authored and co/authored more than 350 peer reviewed journal articles, authored and/or edited 9 books and has been an invited speaker to many academic conferences and lectures, including the 21st Professor Roger W. H. Sargent lecture at Imperial College London (held on 4 December 2014) entitled "Multi-Parametric Programming & Control 25 years later: what is next?". Additionally, Pistikopoulos has been elected a fellow of the Royal Academy of Engineering in 2013.

== Education ==
Pistikopoulos received his diploma in chemical engineering from Aristotle University of Thessaloniki, Greece in 1984. Following which he pursued a Ph.D. at Carnegie Mellon University in Pittsburgh where he worked under the supervision of Ignacio Grossmann. He graduated in 1988; his thesis was entitled "Systematic procedures to improve process flexibility in retrofit design". After working with Shell Chemicals in Amsterdam, he joined Imperial College London in 1991 as an assistant professor.

== Professional career ==
Pistikopoulos served as the director of the Centre for Process Systems Engineering at Imperial College London from 2002 to 2009. Pistikopoulos joined the Artie McFerrin Department of Chemical Engineering at Texas A&M University in 2015 as the TEES Distinguished Research Professor, with a simultaneous appointment as the associate director of the Texas A&M Energy Institute. He was appointed as the director of the institute in 2018. Since 2020, Pistikopoulos has also held the Dow Chemical Chair. He is also the founder/director of Parametric Optimization Solutions (ParOS Ltd), as well as the co-founder of PSE Ltd, where he currently serves as a senior strategic advisor.

Pistikopoulos has been the (co-)recipient of the MacRobert Award from the Royal Academy of Engineering in 2007, the Advances Investigator Award from the European Research Council in 2008, holding the Bayer Lecture in Process Systems Engineering at Carnegie Mellon University in 2009 and delivering the 21st Roger W.H. Sargent lecture at Imperial College in 2014. Additionally, he received the Computing in Chemical Engineering Award of the Computing and Systems Technology division of the American Institute of Chemical Engineers in 2012 and was awarded the title of Doctor Honoris Causa from the University of Bucharest in 2014, and from the University of Pannonia in 2015. In 2013, he was elected fellow of the Royal Academy of Engineering in the United Kingdom. Pistikopoulos currently has a h-index of 72.

Pistikopoulos was awarded the 2020 Sargent Medal, which is named after Roger W. H. Sargent, by the Institution of Chemical Engineers.

== Research interests ==
- The development of parametric programming theory, as well as the development of novel algorithms and solution procedures for certain classes of problems.
- The application of parametric programming to model predictive control, which allows for the explicit solution of the underlying optimization problem, hence removing the necessity of online optimization
- The use and refinement of the PAROC Framework and software platform, a unified framework and software platform for the design, operational optimization and model-based control of process systems.
- Research regarding energy systems engineering, with a particular focus on holistic, system-based approach producing optimal design and operational plans for multi-scale systems.
- Biomedical systems engineering, and in particular the use of an interdisciplinary approach towards the modelling and optimization of biomedical systems
- Sustainable manufacturing, which includes aspects such as process integration, pollution prevention and process sustainability.
