= ΑΒΒ =

Second-order deterministic global optimization algorithm

αΒΒ is a second-order deterministic global optimization algorithm for finding the optima of general, twice continuously differentiable functions. The algorithm is based around creating a relaxation for nonlinear functions of general form by superposing them with a quadratic of sufficient magnitude, called α, such that the resulting superposition is enough to overcome the worst-case scenario of non-convexity of the original function. Since a quadratic has a diagonal Hessian matrix, this superposition essentially adds a number to all diagonal elements of the original Hessian, such that the resulting Hessian is positive-semidefinite. Thus, the resulting relaxation is a convex function.

== Theory ==
Let a function ${f(\boldsymbol{x}) \in C^2}$ be a function of general non-linear non-convex structure, defined in a finite box $X=\{\boldsymbol{x}\in \mathbb{R}^n:\boldsymbol{x}^L\leq\boldsymbol{x}\leq\boldsymbol{x}^U\}$. Then, a convex underestimation (relaxation) $L(\boldsymbol{x})$ of this function can be constructed over $X$ by superposing a sum of univariate quadratics, each of sufficient magnitude to overcome the non-convexity of ${f(\boldsymbol{x})}$ everywhere in $X$, as follows:

$$L(\boldsymbol{x})=f(\boldsymbol{x})+\sum_{i=1}^{i=n}\alpha_i(x_i^L - x_i)(x_i^U - x_i)$$

$L(\boldsymbol{x})$ is called the $\alpha \text{BB}$ underestimator for general functional forms. If all $\alpha_i$ are sufficiently large, the new function $L(\boldsymbol{x})$ is convex everywhere in $X$. Thus, local minimization of $L(\boldsymbol{x})$ yields a rigorous lower bound on the value of ${f(\boldsymbol{x})}$ in that domain.

== Calculation of $\boldsymbol{\alpha}$ ==
There are numerous methods to calculate the values of the $\boldsymbol{\alpha}$ vector. It is proven that when $\alpha_i=\max\{0,-\frac{1}{2}\lambda_i^{\min}\}$, where $\lambda_i^{\min}$ is a valid lower bound on the $i$-th eigenvalue of the Hessian matrix of ${f(\boldsymbol{x})}$, the $L(\boldsymbol{x})$ underestimator is guaranteed to be convex.

One of the most popular methods to get these valid bounds on eigenvalues is by use of the Scaled Gerschgorin theorem. Let $H(X)$ be the interval Hessian matrix of ${f(X)}$ over the interval $X$. Then, $\forall d_i>0$ a valid lower bound on eigenvalue $\lambda_i$ may be derived from the $i$-th row of $H(X)$ as follows:

$$\lambda_i^{\min}=\underline{h_{ii}}-\sum_{i\neq j}(\max(|\underline{h_{ij}}|,|\overline{h_{ij}}|\frac{d_j}{d_i})$$

Where $h_{ij}$ are the entries of the Hessian matrix $H(X)$.
