= Harry Coonce =

American mathematician (1938–2025)

Harry Bernard Coonce
- Born: March 19, 1938
- Died: February 14, 2025 (aged 86)
- Education: University of Delaware
- Known for: Mathematics Genealogy Project
- Spouse: Susan Schilling (m. 1995; died 2016)
- Scientific career
- Fields: Mathematics
- Workplaces: Minnesota State University, Mankato
- Thesis: A Variational Method for Functions of Bounded Boundary Rotation (1969)
- Doctoral advisor: Malcolm Robertson

Harry Bernard Coonce (March 19, 1938 – February 14, 2025) was an American mathematician notable for being the originator of the now-popular Mathematics Genealogy Project, launched in 1996, a web-based catalog of mathematics doctoral advisors and students.

Coonce conceived of the idea while reading the unsigned thesis of his academic advisor Malcolm Robertson, in the Princeton University library, and wondering who his advisor's advisor was. The amount of time it took Coonce, without the existence of a central database of such information, to find out that Robertson's advisor was C. Einar Hille, gave him the idea for the project. In a 2000 interview, Coonce estimated that the project would top out at about 80,000 entries. In June 2016, the number of entries surpassed 200,000, and had just over 300,000 as of December 2023.

== Background ==
Coonce completed his PhD in 1969 at the University of Delaware with a dissertation on A Variational Method for Functions of Bounded Boundary Rotation. Coonce was a mathematics professor of Minnesota State University, Mankato.

Coonce married Susan Schilling, a computer scientist who died in 2016. He died on February 14, 2025, at the age of 86.
