= Fengqi You =

Professor and computer scientist

- Born: 1983 (age 42–43)
- Citizenship: United States
- Known for: Energy systems engineering, process systems engineering, optimization, sustainability, control and automation, computational and data sciences, AI for Science
- Awards: AAAS Fellow, AIChE Fellow, Fellow of RSC
- Scientific career
- Fields: Systems engineering
- Workplaces: Cornell University
- Doctoral advisor: Ignacio E. Grossmann
- Website: https://www.duffield.cornell.edu/people/fengqi-you/ or https://peese.org

Fengqi You is a professor and holds the Roxanne E. and Michael J. Zak Chair at Cornell University in the United States. His research focuses on systems engineering, AI4S, and data science. According to Google Scholar, his h-index is 108.

== Career ==
Fengqi You completed his undergraduate studies at Tsinghua University, and received his Ph.D. in 2009 from Carnegie Mellon University. After working at Argonne National Laboratory and Northwestern University, he moved to Cornell University, where he holds positions in Systems Engineering, Computer Science, Electrical and Computer Engineering, Chemical and Biomolecular Engineering, Applied Mathematics, Operations Research and Information Engineering, Applied Information Systems, Civil and Environmental Engineering, and Mechanical Engineering. He is co-director of Cornell Institute of Digital Agriculture, and Chair of Ph.D. Studies in Cornell Systems Engineering. He co-directs Cornell University AI for Science Institute (CUAISci) and co-leads the Schmidt AI in Science Postdoctoral Fellowship Program at Cornell with Carla Gomes. He is also the director of the Cornell AI4S Initiative (CAISI).

You is an associate editor of Science Advances, an associate editor of IEEE Transactions on Control Systems Technology, an associate editor of Applied Energy, and editor of Computers & Chemical Engineering. He is a member of the editorial boards of ACM Transactions on AI for Science, ACS Sustainable Chemistry & Engineering, AIChE Journal, and Industrial & Engineering Chemistry Research.

== Teaching and research ==
Fengqi You teaches courses on computational optimization, machine learning, deep learning, quantum computing and artificial intelligence, AI for materials, AI for sustainability, and process design. He developed a graduate certificate program on Computational and Data Science. He also teaches courses on AI for Materials, AI for Sustainability, AI for Science, AI for Energy Systems, and AI for Digital Agriculture. There are news media reports about his research on quantum artificial intelligence, renewable energy transition, smart energy systems, solar energy materials, electric vehicle batteries, water management, climate impacts of hybrid events and metaverse, carbon neutrality, microplastics, plastics and medical waste recycling, carbon footprint accounting, crypto, the environmental effects of bitcoin, digital agriculture, AI for materials, and AI in Science.

== Awards ==
- 2010 — Carnegie Mellon University Ken Meyer Award
- 2013 — Northwestern-Argonne Early Career Investigator Award
- 2016 — NSF Career Award
- 2017 — American Institute of Chemical Engineers Environmental Division Award
- 2017 — Sustainable Engineering Research Award
- 2018 — Cornell Research Excellence Award
- 2018 — ACS Sustainable Chemistry & Engineering Lectureship Award
- 2019 — Excellence in Process Development Research Award by AIChE
- 2020 — Program Committee's Award for Innovations in Green Process Engineering
- 2020 — Curtis W. McGraw Research Award from American Society for Engineering Education
- 2020 — American Automatic Control Council O. Hugo Schuck Award
- 2021 — Fellow of the Royal Society of Chemistry (FRSC)
- 2022 — Stratis V. Sotirchos Lectureship Award, Foundation for Research & Technology – Hellas
- 2022 — Fellow of the American Institute of Chemical Engineers (AIChE Fellow)
- 2023 — Fellow of AAAS
- 2024 — Amazon Research Award
- 2024 — Lawrence K. Cecil Award in Environmental Chemical Engineering
- 2026 — AIChE Professional Achievement Award for Innovations in Green Process Engineering
- 2026 — AIChE David Himmelblau Award for Innovations in Computer-Based Chemical Engineering Education
