= Roger Sargent (chemical engineer) =

English chemical engineer

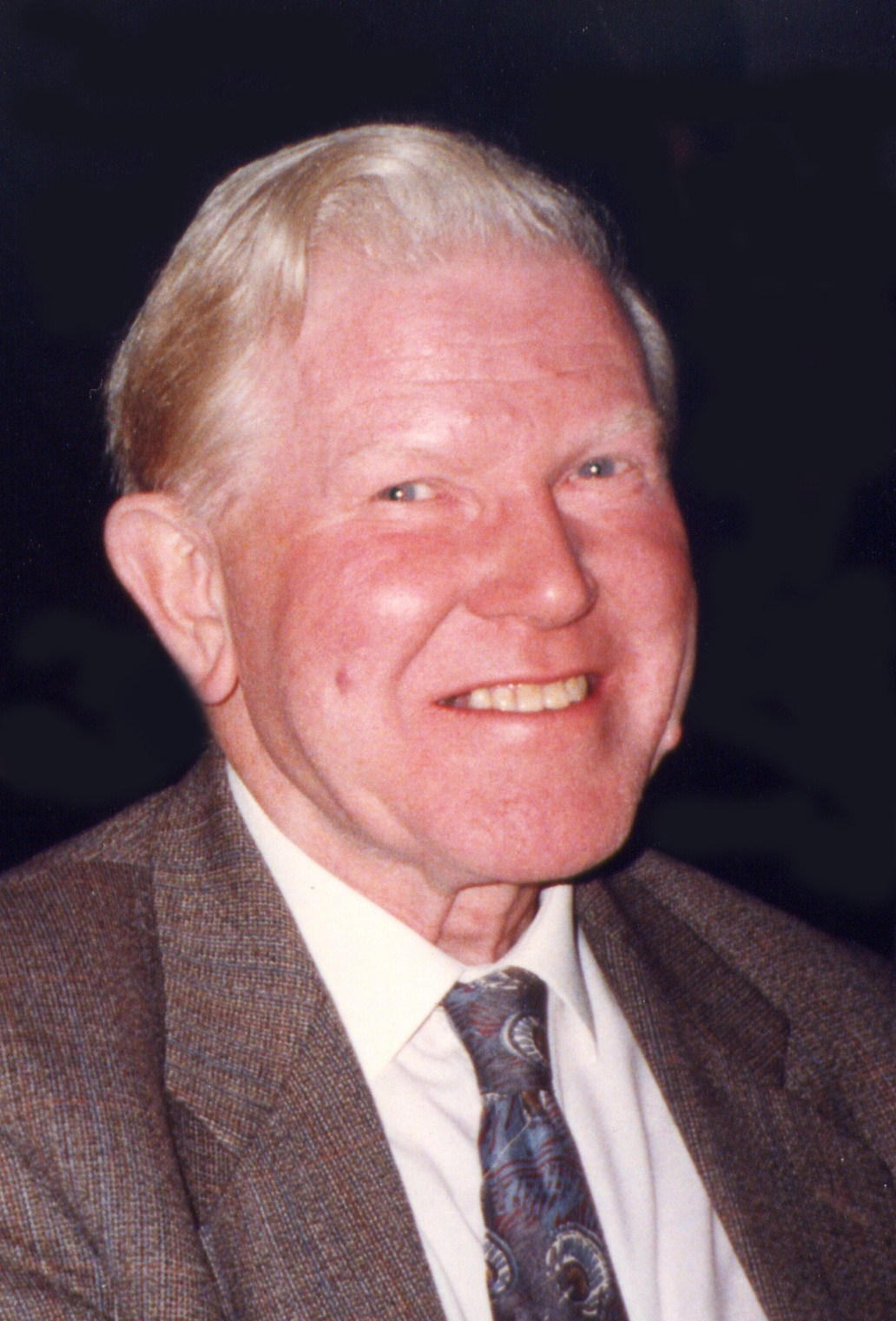
Prof. Roger Sargent

Roger William Herbert Sargent FREng FSA (14 October 1926 – 11 September 2018) was an English chemical engineer who was Courtaulds professor of Chemical engineering at Imperial College London and "the father" of the discipline of Process Systems Engineering.

== Biography ==
Born on 14 October 1926, Sargent was educated at Bedford School and at Imperial College London where he received a BSc and a PhD in chemical engineering. He worked for Air Liquide in Paris as a practising engineer until 1959 when he returned to the UK and subsequently joined Imperial College as a lecturer. He described those war years and post-war France in his address to the University of Edinburgh. His career advanced and he was made Courtaulds professor of Chemical engineering at Imperial College London between 1966 and 1992, dean of the City and Guilds College from 1973 to 1976, head of the Department of Chemical Engineering from 1975 to 1988 and director of the Centre for Process Systems Engineering (which he founded) from its launch in August 1989 until his retirement in 1992, when he became a senior research fellow and emeritus professor in the centre and a foreign associate of the US National Academy of Engineering.

Sargent died on 11 September 2018.

== Chemical engineering ==
Roger Sargent became a professor at Imperial College at an important point in the development of his profession. He was very aware of this, and that his experience of eight years as a practising engineer at Air Liquide in Paris gave him a particular insight into how the subject should be taught:

"the concept of the engineer that I have been trying to build up, and it is precisely the combination of a high degree of competence, and the quantitative approach, with a wider social consciousness and the ability to view problems in their context, that is so valuable" (Inaugural Lecture, 1963).

In particular he was vigorous in promoting that the operation and control of a chemical plant were important and worthy subjects to be taught (previously these had been thought to be the responsibility of semi-skilled operators, not professional engineers), and that the new computers and numerical methods should be fundamental to undergraduate chemical engineering education (this was in 1963). He always pushed for the highest degree of competence in all his students; the computer was never to be used as a way of avoiding important issues:

"they must learn the common standard techniques and know something of such questions as rounding errors, stability, and rate of convergence. To achieve even such slight understanding of numerical matters requires a strong foundation of the more classical branches of mathematics, particularly in the various kinds of linear algebra which have always formed the backbone of engineering mathematics courses — but of course, these must be oriented towards the purpose of the engineer, which is ultimately to produce an answer in terms of number." (Inaugural Lecture, 1963)

== Process systems engineering ==
He is known principally as one of the earliest creators of the discipline of Process Systems Engineering, and his influence has been widely spread through his research and a large academic family tree (Academic genealogy) of research students. In his career at Imperial College he supervised 61 research students, and several of these first-generation students have gone on to establish large research schools of their own. By 2008, this family tree extended to seven generations and 639 students and former students. By 2016 this had grown to over 2,000 students and former students.

Since 1994 his influence is commemorated in the annual "Roger Sargent" lectures at Imperial College.

Sargent is regarded as the "father" of Process Systems Engineering (PSE). His research focused on process modelling, simulation, optimisation and control.

His software "SPEEDUP" (Simulation Programme for the Economic Evaluation and Design of Unsteady-State Processes) was first described in publication in 1964, and this package was widely used in research and industry more than 25 years later.

== Professional affiliations ==
Sargent distinguished himself as an active member of several national and international corporations, namely the Institution of Chemical Engineers, which he joined in 1960 and where he became a president in 1973, and also the Science Research Council, the Council of Engineering Institutions, the European Federation of Chemical Engineering, the Ministry of Technology, the Department of Trade and Industry, the University Grants Committee, the University Funding Council, the British Council and the British-French Mixed Cultural Commission, amongst others, where he acted as a member of several boards and committees.

== Honours ==
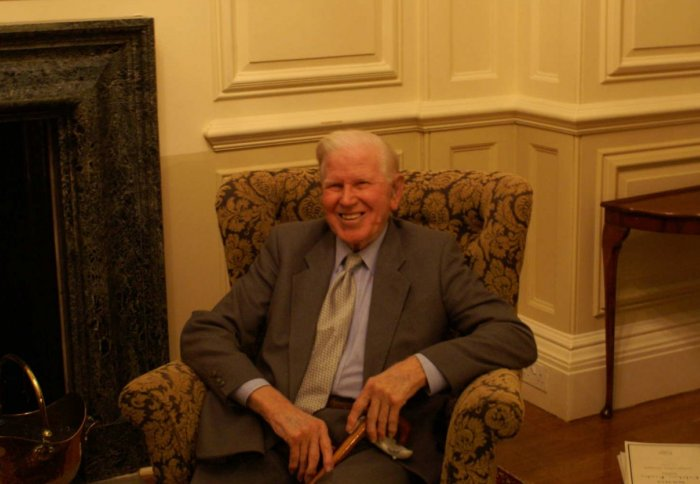
Roger Sargent after attending one of the Roger Sargent lectures at Imperial College

His research and academic contributions have been recognised through a series of prestigious honours, including founder-fellow of the Royal Academy of Engineering (1976), honorary fellowship of the City and Guilds of London Institute (1977), Silver Medal of the "Ville de Paris" (1986), Doctor honoris causa of the Institut National Polytechnique de Lorraine (1987) and of the University of Liège (1995), Fellow of Imperial College (1990), Fellow of the Royal Society of Arts, Richard W. Wilhelm Lectureship of Princeton University (1994), distinguished research lectureship in chemical engineering of Carnegie Mellon University (1996) and the Nordic Process Control Award (2003). The American Institute of Chemical Engineering (AIChemE) awarded him the 1990 'Computing in Chemical Engineering' award The Institution of Chemical Engineers awarded him the inaugural MM Sharma medal in 2015. In September 2016 the Royal Academy of Engineering awarded him the Sir Frank Whittle Medal. The Sir Frank Whittle Medal is awarded to an engineer resident in the UK whose outstanding and sustained achievements have had a profound impact on their engineering discipline.

In addition to the awards he has gained, an award has been named in his honour: in October 2014 the Institution of Chemical Engineers (IChemE) created the Roger Sargent medal for "research in computer-aided product and process engineering". In 2019-2020, Computers & Chemical Engineering developed a special issue in memory and honor of him.

== Personal life ==
Sargent was married to Shirley by whom he had two sons, Philip and Tony.
