= LINDO =

- Developer(s): LINDO SYSTEMS INC.
- Stable release: 14.0 (as of 2023/09/27)
- Type: Mathematical optimization
- License: Proprietary
- Website: lindo.com

LINDO (Linear, Interactive, and Discrete Optimizer) is a software package for linear programming, integer programming, nonlinear programming, stochastic programming and global optimization.

LINGO is a mathematical modeling language used as part of LINDO.

Today, LINDO solvers are part of LINDO API (Application Programming Interface) a set of software libraries that can be called from different programming languages to create custom mathematical optimization applications.

It is designed to solve optimization problems that arise in areas of business, industry, research, and government. The LINDO package includes sample applications related to product distribution, ingredient blending, production, personnel scheduling, inventory management.

LINDO also creates "What'sBest!" which is an add-in for linear, integer and nonlinear optimization. First released for Lotus 1-2-3 and later also for Microsoft Excel.

== Features ==
- LINDO provides routines to formulate, solve, query, and modify optimization problems.
- It works with programming languages including C, C++, Java, Visual Basic, .NET, Delphi, Python, and R.
- Coupled with R’s extensive statistical and data-mining tools, the LINDO API's R interface offers seamless possibilities in statistical analysis and optimization.
- LINDO solvers can also be called from MATLAB.
- The LINDO package contains Stochastic, Linear, Nonlinear (convex & nonconvex/Global), Quadratic, Quadratically Constrained, Second Order Cone and Integer solvers.
- It provides tools for analysis of infeasible linear, integer and nonlinear models.
- LINDO supports Multiple Objective Optimization. For linear models, users can provide a prioritized list of objective functions, and LINDO will perform Lexico/Pre-emptive priority optimization.
- The Multi-Start NLP Solver in LINDO makes it possible for users to specify a target value for the objective function. As soon as any multi-start thread achieves a specified target all threads stop.
- With the release of LINDO API 7.0, LINDO stochastic functionality allows users to incorporate uncertainty into their models.
- In 2012, LINDO brings multicore processors support to increase solve speed.
