= Christodoulos Floudas =

Greek–American chemical engineer

Christodoulos Achilleus Floudas
- Born: 31 August 1959
- Died: 14 August 2016 (aged 56)
- Education: Carnegie Mellon University
- Scientific career
- Workplaces: Princeton University, Texas A&M University
- Doctoral advisor: Ignacio Grossmann

Christodoulos Achilleus Floudas (August 31, 1959 – August 14, 2016) was a Greek–American chemical engineer.

Floudas completed a diploma in chemical engineering at the Aristotle University of Thessaloniki in 1982, and received his Ph.D. in 1986 at Carnegie Mellon University under the guidance of Ignacio Grossmann. Floudas began teaching at Princeton University upon earning his doctorate, and was later named the Stephen C. Macaleer ’63 Professor in Engineering and Applied Science. From February 2015, he was the director of the Energy Institute at Texas A&M University, as well as the Erle Nye ’59 Chair Professor for Engineering Excellence within the Artie McFerrin Department of Chemical Engineering.

His research areas were global optimization and process systems engineering. In 2011, Floudas was elected a member of the National Academy of Engineering "[f]or contributions to theory, methods, and applications of global optimization in process systems engineering, computational chemistry, and molecular biology." In 2013, he was elected a fellow of the Society for Industrial and Applied Mathematics. From 2014 to 2015, Floudas was listed as one of the highly cited researchers. His h-index is 100 according to Google Scholar.

== Personal life ==
Floudas was born in Ioannina, Greece on 31 August 1959. He died on 14 August 2016 while on vacation in Chalkidiki, Greece at the age of 56.
