= BARON =

- Developer: The Optimization Firm
- Written in: Fortran, C, C++, YACC
- Operating system: Windows, Linux, macOS
- Type: Mathematical Optimization, Operations Research
- License: Proprietary
- Website: minlp.com

BARON is a computational system for solving non-convex optimization problems to global optimality. Purely continuous, purely integer, and mixed-integer nonlinear problems can be solved by the solver. Linear programming (LP), nonlinear programming (NLP), mixed integer programming (MIP), and mixed integer nonlinear programming (MINLP) are supported. In a comparison of different solvers, BARON solved the most benchmark problems and required the least time per problem.

BARON is available under the AIMMS, AMPL, GAMS, JuMP, MATLAB, Pyomo, and YALMIP modeling environments on a variety of platforms. The GAMS/BARON solver is also available on the NEOS Server.

The development of the BARON algorithms and software has been recognized by the 2004 INFORMS Computing Society Prize and the 2006 Beale-Orchard-Hays Prize for excellence in computational mathematical programming from the Mathematical Optimization Society. BARON's inventor, Nick Sahinidis, was inducted into the National Academy of Engineering in October 2022 for his contributions to science and engineering.
