= Index of physics articles (U) =

The index of physics articles is split into multiple pages due to its size.

To navigate by individual letter use the table of contents below.

== U ==
- U-duality
- U.S. Standard Atmosphere
- UA1 experiment
- UA2 experiment
- UC Santa Barbara Physics Department
- UK Dark Matter Collaboration
- UMER
- UMIST linear system
- UNIT OF REFRIGERATION
- UPTI Affair
- USAF Stability and Control DATCOM
- UV completion
- UV fixed point
- Über die von der molekularkinetischen Theorie der Wärme geforderte Bewegung von in ruhenden Flüssigkeiten suspendierten Teilchen
- Über quantentheoretische Umdeutung kinematischer und mechanischer Beziehungen
- Udipi Ramachandra Rao
- Ugo Fano
- Ukichiro Nakaya
- Ulf Leonhardt
- Ultimate fate of the universe
- Ultra-high-energy cosmic ray
- Ultra-low frequency
- Ultra high frequency
- Ultrafast x-rays
- Ultrahigh energy gamma-ray
- Ultralight trike
- Ultraluminous X-ray source
- Ultramicroscope
- Ultrarelativistic limit
- Ultrashort pulse
- Ultrasoft radiation
- Ultrasonic flow meter
- Ultrasonic foil (papermaking)
- Ultrasonic force microscopy
- Ultrasonic hearing
- Ultrasonic horn
- Ultrasonic nozzle
- Ultrasonic sensor
- Ultrasonic testing
- Ultrasonic welding
- Ultrasonics
- Ultrasound
- Ultrasound-enhanced systemic thrombolysis
- Ultrasound attenuation spectroscopy
- Ultraviolet
- Ultraviolet catastrophe
- Ultraviolet divergence
- Umklapp scattering
- Unbiennium
- Uncertainty
- Uncertainty principle
- Unconventional wind turbines
- Undercompressive shock wave
- Understanding Physics
- Undertow (wave action)
- Underwater acoustic communication
- Underwater acoustic positioning system
- Underwater acoustics
- Underwater telephone
- Undulation of the geoid
- Undulator
- Undulatory theory of light
- Unequal rotor lift distribution
- Uniaxial crystal
- Unified field theory
- Uniform acceleration
- Uniform circular motion
- Uniform motion
- Uniform theory of diffraction
- Uniqueness theorem for Poisson's equation
- Unit commensurability
- Unit of length
- Unitarity (physics)
- Unitarity bound
- Unitarity gauge
- Unitary Plan Wind Tunnel
- United States Air Force Stability and Control Digital DATCOM
- United States Invitational Young Physicists Tournament
- United States National Physics Olympiad
- Units of measurement
- Universal conductance fluctuations
- Universal extra dimension
- Universal force field
- Universal linear accelerator
- Universal quantum simulator
- Universal wave function
- Universality (dynamical systems)
- Universe
- Unparticle physics
- Unrestricted Hartree–Fock
- Unruh effect
- Unruh temperature
- Unsepttrium
- Unsolved problems in astronomy
- Untriseptium
- Up quark
- Upper-atmospheric lightning
- Upper-convected Maxwell model
- Upper-convected time derivative
- Upper critical solution temperature
- Upper hybrid oscillation
- Upper tangent arc
- Upsilon meson
- Upward continuation
- Upward looking sonar
- Upwind scheme
- Uranium
- Uranium boride
- Uranium carbide
- Uranium dioxide
- Uranium hydride bomb
- Uranium in the environment
- Uranium pentafluoride
- Uranium tetrachloride
- Uranium tetrafluoride
- Uranyl carbonate
- Uranyl nitrate
- Uranyl peroxide
- Urca process
- Uriel Frisch
- Ursell number
- Ursula Franklin
- Uspekhi Fizicheskikh Nauk
- Ussing chamber
- Uzi Landman
