= B2 1420+32 =

Quasar in the constellation of Boötes

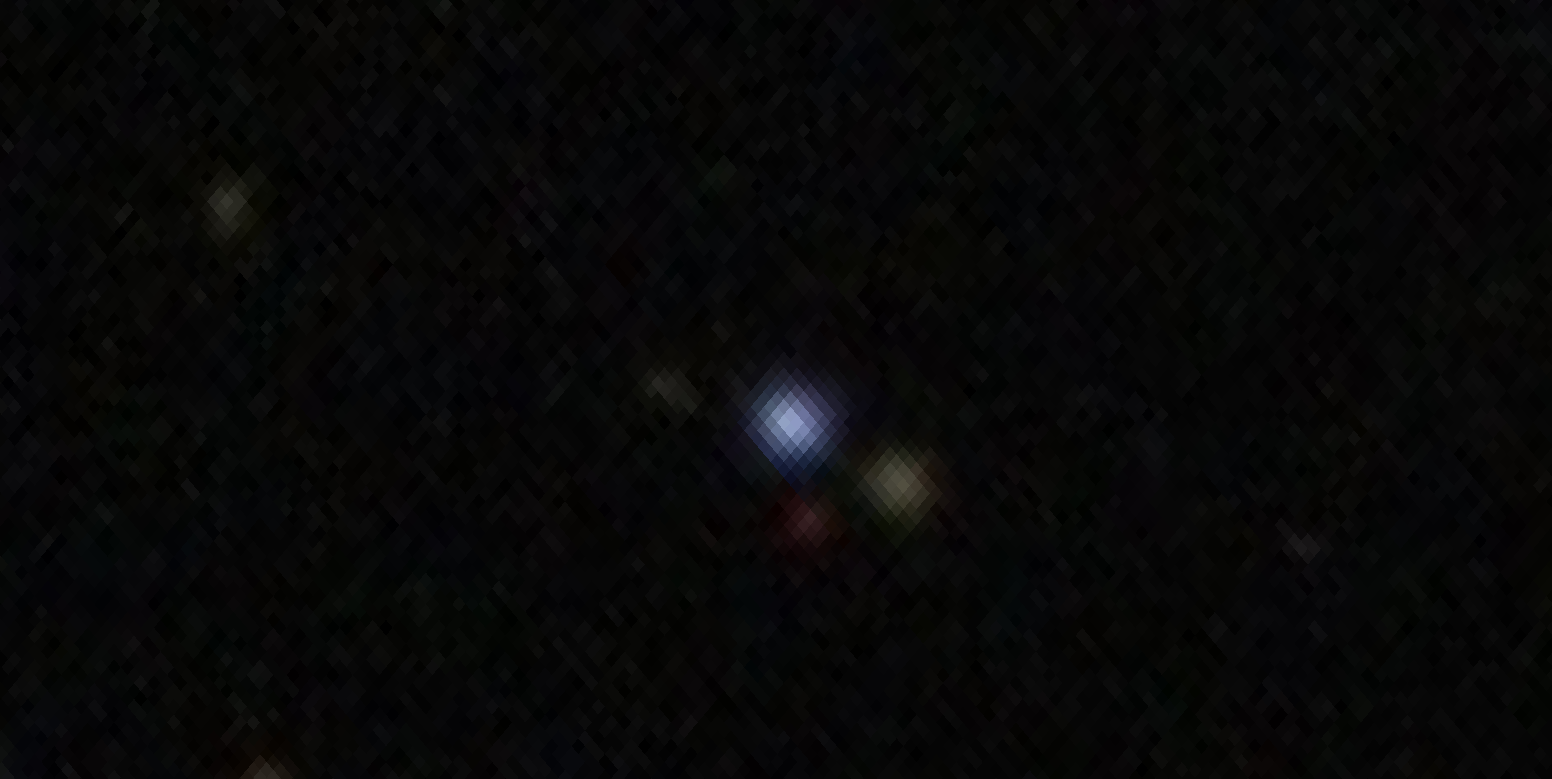
- SDSS image of B2 1420+32 (located center)

Observation data (J2000.0 epoch)
- Constellation: Boötes
- Right ascension: 14^{h} 22^{m} 30.380^{s}
- Declination: +32° 23′ 10.440″
- Redshift: 0.682
- Heliocentric radial velocity: 143,130 km/s
- Distance: 6.3 billion light years
- Apparent magnitude (V): 19.16

Characteristics
- Type: FSRQ

Other designations
- FBQS J1422+3223, 6C 142016+323628, OHIO Q 334, QSO B1420+326, 7C 142021.30+323647.00, RX J1422.5+3223, NVSS J142230+322309, PGC 4066234

B2 1420+32 also known as OQ 334 and QSO B1420+326, is a flat-spectrum radio quasar in the constellation of Boötes. Its redshift is estimated as (z) 0.682 corresponding to a light travel time of 6.3 billion light years and was first detected in March 1973 as a blue stellar object. This object gained significant attention because of its renewed flaring activity, categorized as changing looking blazar and is the fourth known distant object displaying very high energy radio emission.

== Description ==
B2 1420+32 is extremely variable on an electromagnetic spectrum. A known blazar, it is shown to undergo extreme gamma-ray activity in 2018 after a ten-year quiescent period, displaying a three-day flux of 4.79 ± 0.59 averaging a photon index of 1.96 ± 0.10. The same year in December, it reached a daily average gamma-ray flux of 1.3 ± 0.2 × 10^{−6} photons cm^{−2} s^{−1}, making it 180 times greater than its observed flux in the four year observation period. On December 30 and 31 in 2019, the fluxes were estimated to be 0.9 ± 0.1 × 10^{−6} photons cm^{−2} s^{−1} and 1.7 ± 0.2 × 10^{−6} photons cm^{−2} s^{−1}. Two near-infrared flares were observed from the object displaying a K-band flux of 14.28 ± 0.05 on June 27, 2019, and H-band flux of 12.14 ± 0.03 on March 31, 2023.

During the first month of 2020, B2 1420+32 underwent a high energy powerful gamma-ray flare, with its radio emission noted as increasing by February. In July 2021, it again underwent a flaring period, detected by astronomers at 14 and 7 milliammeter bands, who happened to observe it as part of the TELAMON program. Raj Prince noted one of the peaks during its flaring state display the highest known gamma-ray photon level at 77 GeV, indicating the emitting region is either situated on the broad-line region outer boundary or at the torus inner edge. DCF analysis, would find the time lags of its light curve is 1.69 days.

Additionally to its extreme gamma-ray activity, B2 1420+32 has optical variability. As detected on July 30, 2021, astronomers from the Crimean Astrophysical Observatory noted its increasing activity with an R-band magnitude of 15.156; it previously had an R-band magnitude of 15.50 the previous night. A year later on July 31, 2022, it reached 16.13. The linear polarization levels also increased from 27.5% to 33.5% in 2021 but decreased to 22.5% in 2022.

The nucleus of B2 1420+32 is constantly active due to a presence of its accretion disk around its supermassive black hole. The black hole in the center of the object, is estimated to be 4 × 10^{8} M_{☉} based on a virial-based scaling relationship with an accretion disk luminosity of 2 × 10^{18} erg s^{−1}.

The active galactic nucleus (AGN) of B2 1420+32 can be described as change looking, marked by a series of changes in spectral variability and broad emission lines. The object is categorized as a flat-spectrum (FSRQ) radio quasar, but flaring activity occurring in January 2018 lead the observers to reclassify it as a BL Lacertae object (BL Lac). However 96 days later, it has since reverted to back to its original classification of an FSRQ, but since changed again to its BL Lac state after 416 days in July 2019 and so on. This is suggested by changes in its accretion mode but was later revealed the jet of B2 1420+32 actually influenced the change in its continuum flux, thus the change of classification between FSRQ and BL Lac.

Polarized intensity radio mapping by Very Long Baseline Array, have showed the source of B2 1420+32 is made up of a bright single radio core situated at the jet's northwestern end, with a weaker extended jet feature located at a position angle of 130°. There is a polarized feature interpreted as a jet knot shown separating from the core. Linear approximation has found the knot is moving at superluminal motion at speeds of 12.0 ± 1.7c and happens to be ejecting. The polarization direction close to the direction of the jet also suggested the knot might be interpreted as a moving shock.
