= General Mission Analysis Tool =

Space mission analysis software

- Release: 2007; 19 years ago
- Stable release: R2022a / January 2023; 3 years ago
- Written in: C++
- Operating system: Windows, Linux, macOS
- Type: Technical computing
- License: Apache 2.0
- Website: gmat.atlassian.net/wiki/spaces/GW/overview
- Repository: sourceforge.net/projects/gmat/files/GMAT/

General Mission Analysis Tool (GMAT) is outer space mission analysis software developed by NASA and private industry. It is free and open-source software with an Apache License 2.0.

It has been used for several missions, including LCROSS, the Lunar Reconnaissance Orbiter, OSIRIS-REx, the Magnetospheric Multiscale Mission, and the Transiting Exoplanet Survey Satellite (TESS) mission.

GMAT is an open-source alternative to software like Systems Tool Kit and FreeFlyer.

== See also ==
- List of aerospace engineering software
