= Oblique shock =

Shock wave that is inclined with respect to the incident upstream flow direction

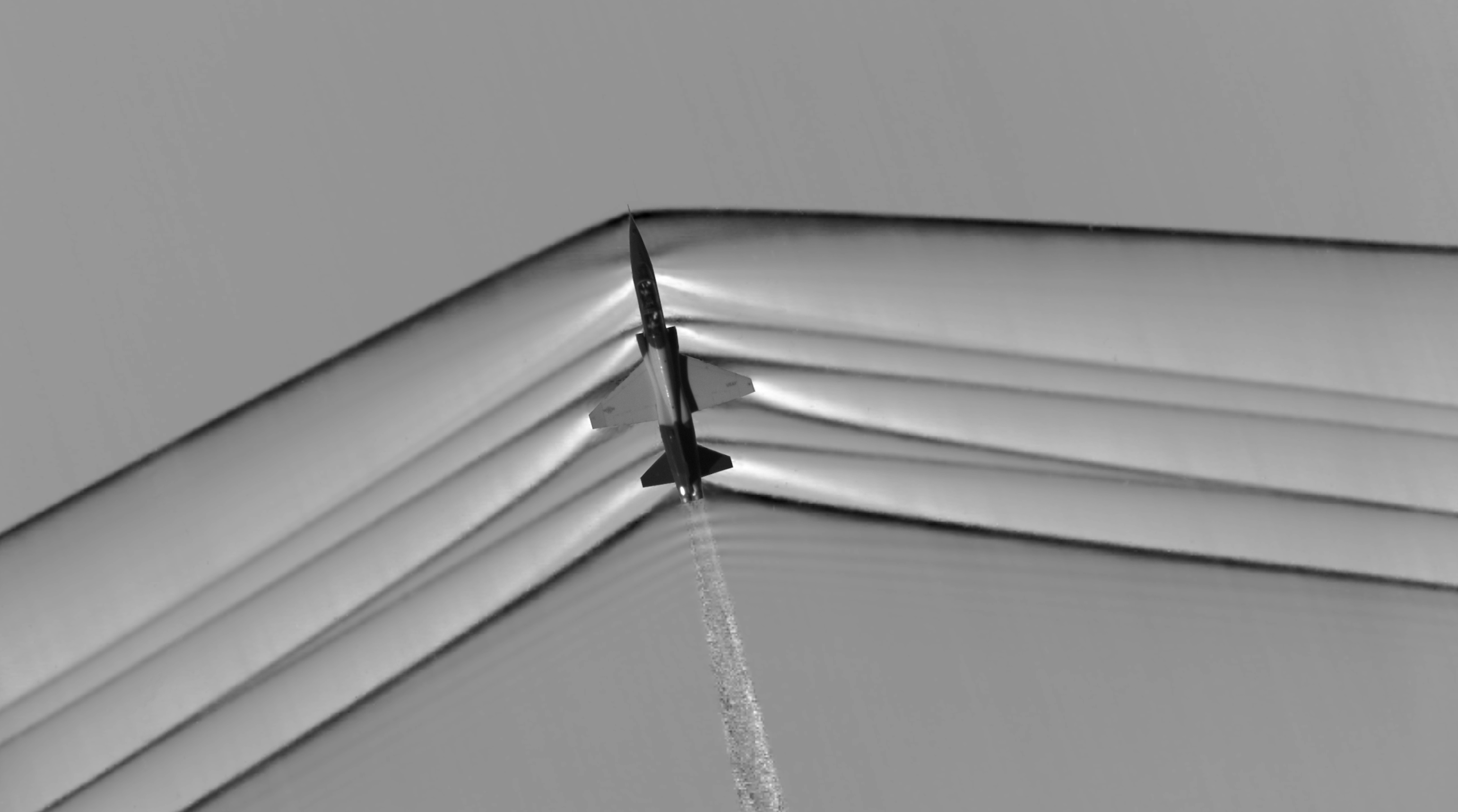
An oblique shock at the nose of a T-38 aircraft is made visible through Schlieren photography

An oblique shock wave is a shock wave that, unlike a normal shock, is inclined with respect to the direction of incoming air. It occurs when a supersonic flow encounters a corner that effectively turns the flow into itself and compresses. The upstream streamlines are uniformly deflected after the shock wave. The most common way to produce an oblique shock wave is to place a wedge into supersonic, compressible flow. Similar to a normal shock wave, the oblique shock wave consists of a very thin region across which nearly discontinuous changes in the thermodynamic properties of a gas occur. While the upstream and downstream flow directions are unchanged across a normal shock, they are different for flow across an oblique shock wave.

It is always possible to convert an oblique shock into a normal shock by a Galilean transformation.

== Wave theory ==
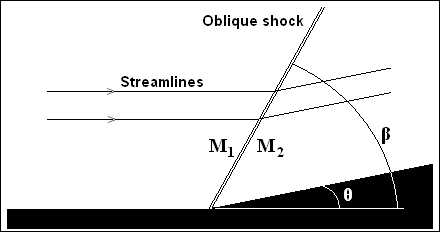
Supersonic flow encounters a wedge and is uniformly deflected forming an oblique shock.

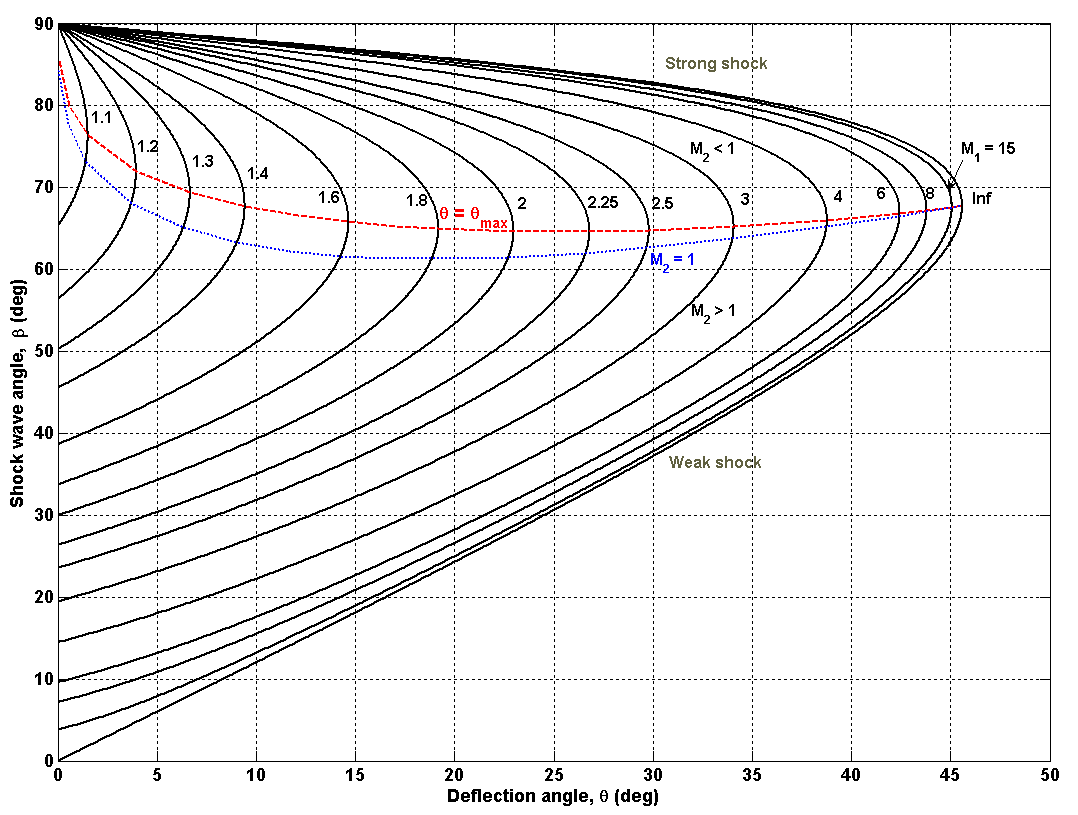
This chart shows the oblique shock angle, β, as a function of the corner angle, θ, for a few constant M_{1} lines. The red line separates the strong and weak solutions. The blue line represents the point when the downstream Mach number becomes sonic. The chart assumes γ = 1.4, which is valid for an ideal diatomic gas.

For a given Mach number, M_{1}, and corner angle, θ, the oblique shock angle, β, and the downstream Mach number, M_{2}, can be calculated. Unlike after a normal shock where M_{2} must always be less than 1, in oblique shock M_{2} can be supersonic (weak shock wave) or subsonic (strong shock wave). Weak solutions are often observed in flow geometries open to atmosphere (such as on the outside of a flight vehicle). Strong solutions may be observed in confined geometries (such as inside a nozzle intake). Strong solutions are required when the flow needs to match the downstream high pressure condition. Discontinuous changes also occur in the pressure, density and temperature, which all rise downstream of the oblique shock wave.

=== The θ-β-M equation ===
Using the continuity equation and the fact that the tangential velocity component does not change across the shock, trigonometric relations eventually lead to the θ-β-M equation which shows θ as a function of M_{1}, β and ɣ, where ɣ is the heat capacity ratio.

$$\tan \theta = 2\cot\beta\ \frac{M_1^2\sin^2\!\beta-1}{M_1^2(\gamma+\cos2\beta)+2}$$

It is more intuitive to want to solve for β as a function of M_{1} and θ, but this approach is more complicated, the results of which are often contained in tables or calculated through a numerical method.

=== Maximum deflection angle ===
Within the θ-β-M equation, a maximum corner angle, θ_{MAX}, exists for any upstream Mach number. When θ > θ_{MAX}, the oblique shock wave is no longer attached to the corner and is replaced by a detached bow shock. A θ-β-M diagram, common in most compressible flow textbooks, shows a series of curves that will indicate θ_{MAX} for each Mach number. The θ-β-M relationship will produce two β angles for a given θ and M_{1}, with the larger angle called a strong shock and the smaller called a weak shock. The weak shock is almost always seen experimentally.

The rise in pressure, density, and temperature after an oblique shock can be calculated as follows:

$$\begin{align}
\frac{p_2}{p_1} &= 1 + \frac{2\gamma}{\gamma+1} \left(M_1^2\sin^2\!\beta - 1\right) \\[1ex]
\frac{\rho_2}{\rho_1} &= \, \frac{\left(\gamma+1\right) M_1^2\sin^2\!\beta}{\left(\gamma-1\right) M_1^2\sin^2\!\beta+2} \\[1ex]
\frac{T_2}{T_1} &= \frac{p_2}{p_1}\frac{\rho_1}{\rho_2}.
\end{align}$$

M_{2} is solved for as follows, where $\theta$ is the post-shock flow deflection angle:

$$M_2 = \frac{1}{\sin(\beta-\theta)}\sqrt{\frac{\chi M_1^2 \sin^2\!\beta + 1}{\gamma M_1^2 \sin^2\!\beta - \chi}}.$$
where $\chi = \frac{\gamma - 1}{2}$.

== Wave applications ==
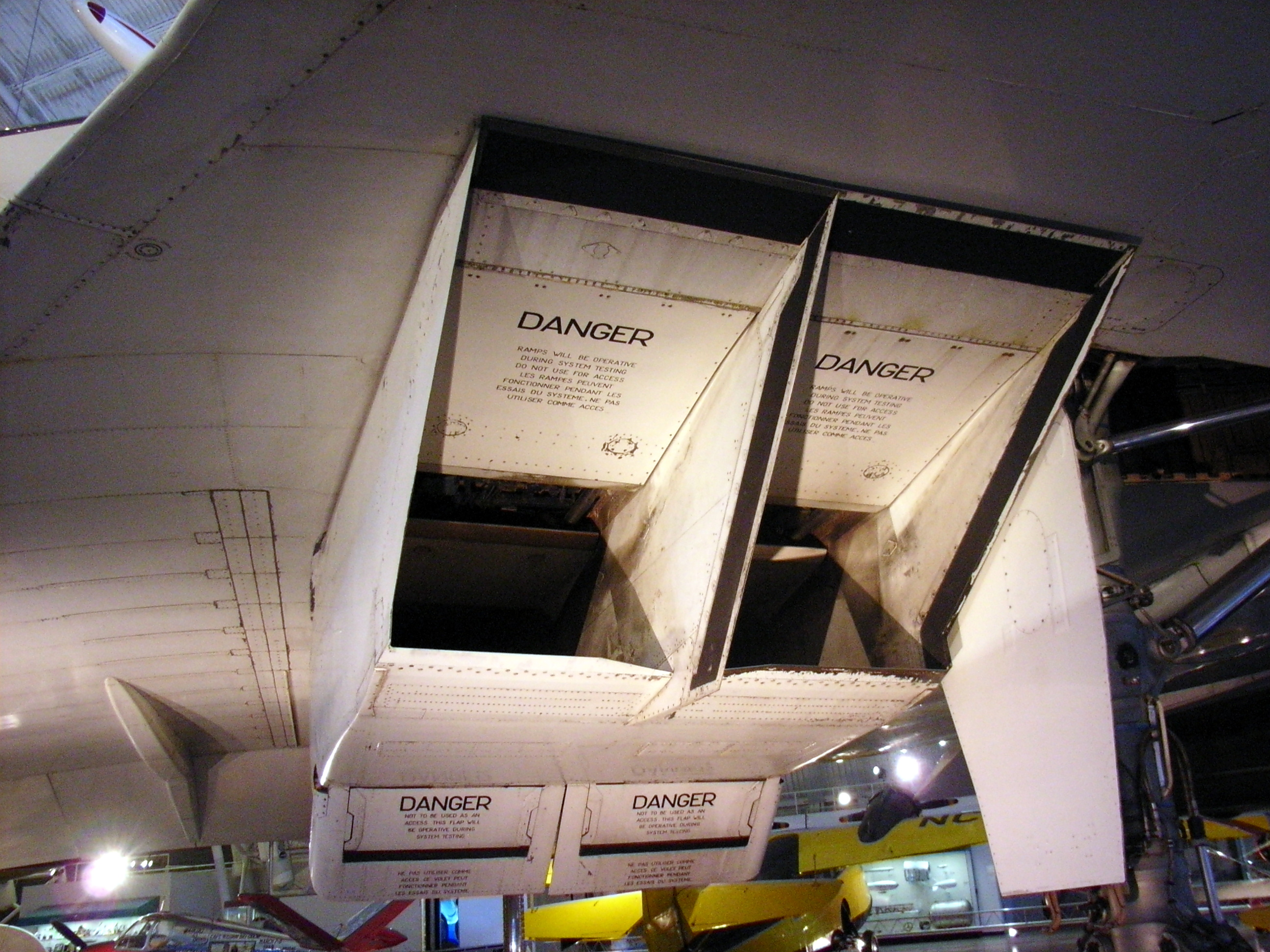
Concorde intake ramp system

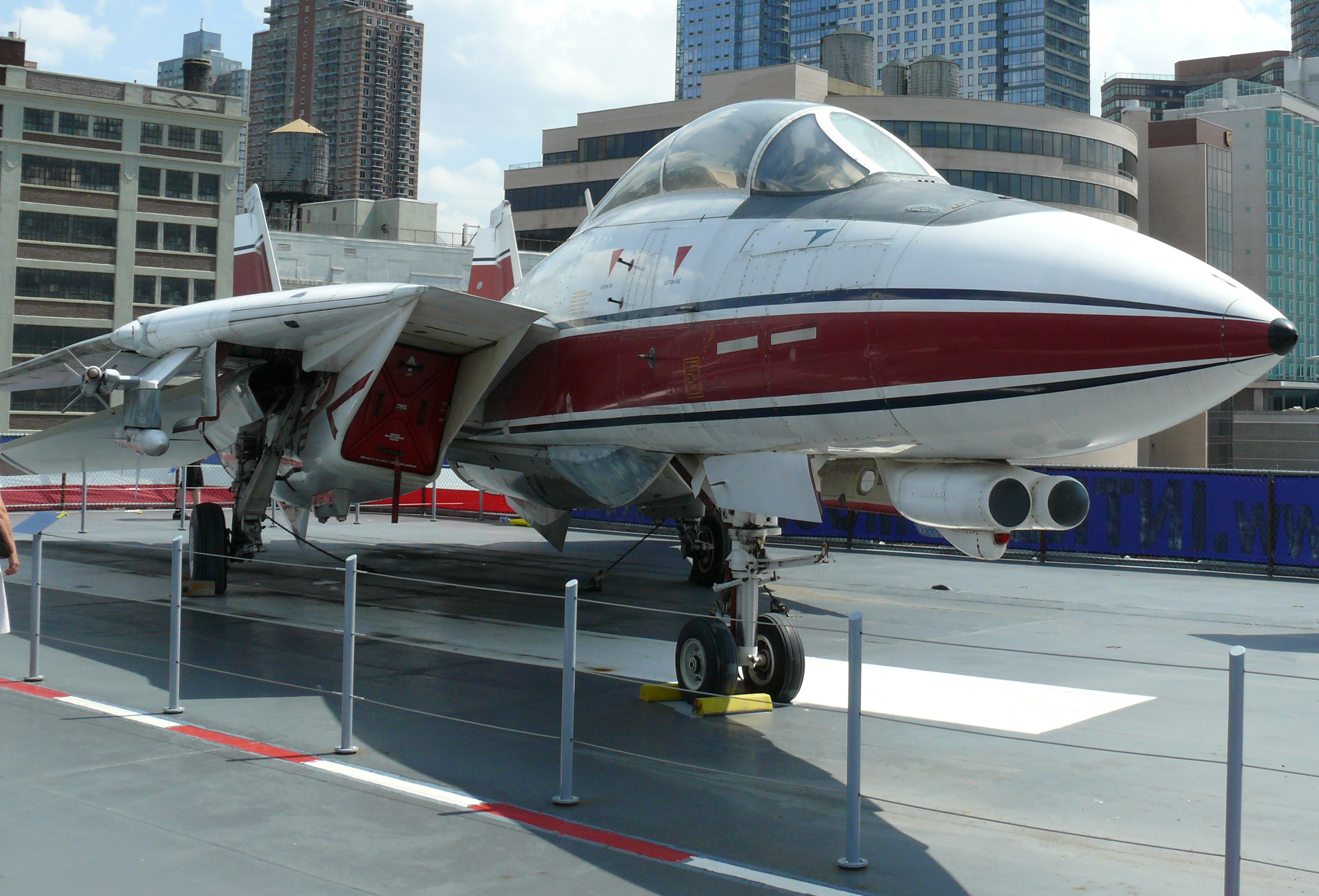
F-14D Tomcat showing wedge-shaped intakes

Oblique shocks are often preferable in engineering applications when compared to normal shocks. This can be attributed to the fact that using one or a combination of oblique shock waves results in more favourable post-shock conditions (smaller increase in entropy, less stagnation pressure loss, etc.) when compared to utilizing a single normal shock. An example of this technique can be seen in the design of supersonic aircraft engine intakes or supersonic inlets. A type of these inlets is wedge-shaped to compress air flow into the combustion chamber while minimizing thermodynamic losses. Early supersonic aircraft jet engine intakes were designed using compression from a single normal shock, but this approach caps the maximum achievable Mach number to roughly 1.6. Concorde (which first flew in 1969) used variable geometry wedge-shaped intakes to achieve a maximum speed of Mach 2.2. A similar design was used on the F-14 Tomcat (the F-14A was first delivered in 1972) and achieved a maximum speed of Mach 2.34.

== Waves and the hypersonic limit ==
As the Mach number of the upstream flow becomes increasingly hypersonic, the equations for the pressure, density, and temperature after the oblique shock wave reach a mathematical limit. The pressure and density ratios can then be expressed as:

$$\begin{align}
\frac{p_2}{p_1} &\approx \frac{2\gamma}{\gamma+1}\ M_1^2\sin^2\!\beta \\
\frac{\rho_2}{\rho_1} &\approx \frac{\gamma+1}{\gamma-1}.
\end{align}$$

For a perfect atmospheric gas approximation using γ = 1.4, the hypersonic limit for the density ratio is 6. However, hypersonic post-shock dissociation of O_{2} and N_{2} into O and N lowers γ, allowing for higher density ratios in nature. The hypersonic temperature ratio is:

$$\frac{T_2}{T_1} \approx \frac{2\gamma\ (\gamma-1)}{(\gamma+1)^2}\ M_1^2\sin^2\!\beta.$$

== See also ==
- Gas dynamics
- Mach reflection – Supersonic flow phenomenon
- Moving shock – Shock wave travelling through a fluid
- Shock polar
