= GMAT (disambiguation) =

GMAT can stand for

- Tan Tan Airport - ICAO code for Moroccan airport
- Graduate Management Admission Test
- General Mission Analysis Tool, an open source astrodynamics computer program developed by NASA
- Greenwich Mean Astronomical Time - see Greenwich Mean Time
