= List of aerospace engineering software =

This is a list of aerospace engineering software which is used for computational fluid dynamics, finite element method structural analysis, flight dynamics, propulsion modeling, and other related engineering applications.

== Table ==
Aerospace Engineering Software
Software	Description	Operating system
Abaqus	Finite element analysis suite	Windows, Linux
Aeroprediction	Empirical aerodynamic prediction tool	Windows
ANSYS	Multiphysics simulation (CFD/FEA)	Windows, Linux
CATIA	CAD/CAM software for aircraft design	Windows
COMSOL Multiphysics	Multiphysics modeling and simulation	Windows, macOS, Linux
Creo	Parametric CAD for engineering design	Windows
Digital DATCOM	Stability and control prediction	Windows, Linux
Dymola	Multi-domain modeling and simulation	Windows, Linux
EcosimPro	Multidomain simulation for aerospace and propulsion	Windows
FreeCAD	Open-source 3D CAD platform	Windows, macOS, Linux
FreeFlyer	Space mission analysis software	Windows
General Mission Analysis Tool	Open-source spacecraft trajectory tool	Windows, macOS, Linux
JSBSim	Open-source flight dynamics model	Windows, macOS, Linux
LabVIEW	Instrumentation and control environment	Windows, macOS, Linux
MATLAB	Numerical computing environment	Windows, macOS, Linux
MATRIXx	Control system modeling software	Windows
Nastran	NASA-origin structural analysis code	Windows, Linux
NPSS	Propulsion system and engine cycle simulation	Windows, Linux
OpenFOAM	Open-source CFD toolbox	Linux, Windows
OpenMDAO	Python framework for aerospace design and optimization	Windows, macOS, Linux
OpenVSP	Parametric aircraft geometry tool	Windows, macOS, Linux
Patran	FEA pre-/post-processor	Windows, Linux
SciPy	Python library for scientific computing in aerospace	Windows, macOS, Linux
Siemens NX	High-end CAD/CAE suite used in aerospace design	Windows, Linux
Simcenter STAR-CCM+	High-end CFD/multiphysics suite	Windows, Linux
Simulink	Graphical modeling and control design	Windows, macOS, Linux
SolidWorks	Mechanical CAD software	Windows
STK	Space mission modeling and analysis	Windows
SU2 code	Open-source aerodynamic CFD suite	Windows, macOS, Linux
TRACE	NASA unsteady aerodynamic and aeroelastic analysis code	Windows, Linux
Teamcenter	Aerospace PLM system	Windows, Linux
XFLR5	Airfoil/wing analysis tool	Windows, macOS, Linux
XFOIL	Airfoil analysis and design tool	Windows, macOS, Linux

- Proprietary
- Open source

== See also ==
- Aircraft design process and Spacecraft design
- Cadec-online.com — inactive aerospace engineering web app
- Comparison of 3D computer graphics software
- Comparison of project management software
- Glossary of aerospace engineering
- List of computational fluid dynamics software
- List of computational physics software
- List of computer-aided engineering software
- List of computer-aided manufacturing software
- List of computer simulation software
- List of finite element software packages
- List of space flight simulation games and List of flight simulator video games
- Rocket propulsion
