= Mach reflection =

Supersonic flow phenomenon

Mach reflection is a supersonic fluid dynamics effect, named for Ernst Mach, and is a shock wave reflection pattern involving three shocks.

== Introduction ==
Mach reflection can exist in steady, pseudo-steady and unsteady flows. When a shock wave, which is moving with a constant velocity, propagates over a solid wedge, the flow generated by the shock impinges on the wedge thus generating a second reflected shock, which ensures that the velocity of the flow is parallel to the wedge surface. Viewed in the frame of the reflection point, this flow is locally steady, and the flow is referred to as pseudosteady. When the angle between the wedge and the primary shock is sufficiently large, a single reflected shock is not able to turn the flow to a direction parallel to the wall and a transition to Mach reflection occurs.

In a steady flow situation, if a wedge is placed into a steady supersonic flow in such a way that its oblique attached shock impinges on a flat wall parallel to the free stream, the shock turns the flow toward the wall and a reflected shock is required to turn the flow back to a direction parallel to the wall. When the shock angle exceeds a certain value, the deflection achievable by a single reflected shock is insufficient to turn the flow back to a direction parallel to the wall and transition to Mach reflection is observed.

Mach reflection consists of three shocks, namely the incident shock, the reflected shock and a Mach stem, as well as a slip plane. The point where the three shocks meet is known as the 'triple point' in two dimensions, or a shock-shock in three dimensions.

== Types of Mach reflection ==
The only type of Mach reflection possible in steady flow is direct-Mach reflection, in which the Mach stem is convex away from the oncoming flow, and the slip plane slopes towards the reflecting surface.

By new results there is a new configuration of shock waves - configuration with a negative angle of reflection in steady flow. Numerical simulations demonstrate two forms of this configuration - one with a kinked reflected shock wave, and an unstable double Mach configuration, depending on the transition path.

In pseudo-steady flows, the triple point moves away from the reflecting surface and the reflection is a direct-Mach reflection. In unsteady flows, it is also possible that the triple point remains stationary relative to the reflecting surface (stationary-Mach reflection), or moves toward the reflecting surface (inverse-Mach reflection). In inverse Mach reflection, the Mach stem is convex toward the oncoming flow, and the slip plane curves away from the reflecting surface. Each one of these configurations can assume one of the following three possibilities: single-Mach reflection, transitional-Mach reflection and double-Mach reflection.

== See also ==
- Gas dynamics
- Shock wave
- Shock polar is a graphical tool to determine whether Mach reflection occurs.
