= Shock polar =

The term shock polar is generally used with the graphical representation of the Rankine–Hugoniot equations in either the hodograph plane or the pressure ratio-flow deflection angle plane. The polar itself is the locus of all possible states after an oblique shock. The shock polar was first introduced by Adolf Busemann in 1929.

== Shock polar in the (φ, p) plane ==
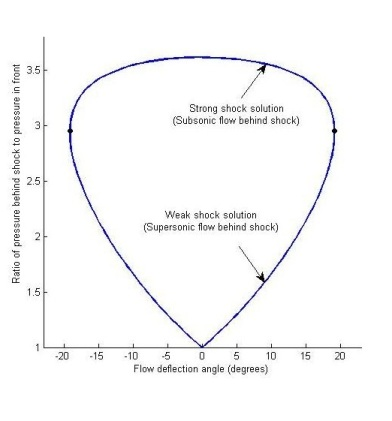
Shock polar in the pressure ratio-flow deflection angle plane for a Mach number of 1.8 and a specific heat ratio 1.4.

The minimum angle, $\theta$, which an oblique shock can have is the Mach angle $\mu =\sin^{-1}(1/M)$, where $M$ is the initial Mach number before the shock and the greatest angle corresponds to a normal shock. The range of shock angles is therefore $\sin^{-1}(1/M)\leq\theta\leq\pi /2$. To calculate the pressures for this range of angles, the Rankine–Hugoniot equations are solved for pressure: $\frac{p}{p_{0}} = 1 + \frac{2\gamma}{\gamma +1} \left(M^{2}\sin^{2}\theta - 1\right)$ To calculate the possible flow deflection angles, the relationship between shock angle $\theta$ and $\varphi$ is used: $\tan\varphi = 2\cot\theta\frac{M^{2}\sin^{2}\theta -1}{2+M^{2}(\gamma +\cos 2\theta )}.$ Where $\gamma$ is the ratio of specific heats and $\varphi$ is the flow deflection angle.

== Uses of shock polars ==
One of the primary uses of shock polars is in the field of shock wave reflection. A shock polar is plotted for the conditions before the incident shock, and a second shock polar is plotted for the conditions behind the shock, with its origin located on the first polar, at the angle through which the incident shock wave deflects the flow. Based on the intersections between the incident shock polar and the reflected shock polar, conclusions as to which reflection patterns are possible may be drawn. Often, it is used to graphically determine whether regular shock reflection is possible, or whether Mach reflection occurs.
