= Aeroprediction =

The Aeroprediction Code is a semi-empirical computer program that estimates the aerodynamics of weapons over the Mach number range 0 to 20, angle of attack range 0 to 90 degrees, and for configurations that have various cross sectional body shapes. Weapons considered include projectiles, missiles, bombs, rockets and mortars. Both static and dynamic aerodynamics are predicted with good accuracy.

The code may be used to compute the center of pressure and static margin of missiles.

The Defense Acquisition Workforce Improvement Act provides insights into how to use aerodynamic prediction codes such as Aeroprediction in the design of missile for US acquisition.

== See also ==
- List of aerospace engineering software
- Missile Datcom
