= TRACE (computer program) =

TRACE is a high-precision orbit determination and orbit propagation program. It was developed by The Aerospace Corporation in El Segundo, California. An early version ran on the IBM 7090 computer in 1964. The Fortran source code can be compiled for any platform with a Fortran compiler.

When Satellite Tool Kit's high-precision orbit propagator and parameter and coordinate frame transformations underwent an Independent Verification and Validation effort in 2000, TRACE v2.4.9 was the standard against which STK was compared.

As of 2013, TRACE is still used by the U.S. Government and some of its technical contractors.

== See also ==
- List of aerospace engineering software
