= Missile Datcom =

Software tool for missile design

Missile DATCOM is a widely used semi-empirical datasheet component build-up method for the prediction of missile aerodynamic coefficients. It is an example of an engineering aeroprediction method which can be used to generate an aerodynamic database of the vehicle’s aerodynamic coefficients at various flight conditions. It has been in continual development for over twenty years, with the latest version released in December 2014. It has traditionally been supplied free of charge by the United States Air Force to American defense contractors. The code is considered restricted under International Traffic in Arms Regulations (ITAR) and should not be distributed outside the United States.

== See also ==
- Digital Datcom
- Aeroprediction
