= The Aerospace Corporation =

California company founded in 1960

- Type: Nonprofit organization
- Industry: Aerospace
- Founded: June 3, 1960
- Headquarters: Chantilly, Virginia, United States
- Key people: Tanya Pemberton (President and CEO); Paul Selva (Chairman)
- Revenue: US$1.29 billion (FY2023)
- Number of employees: 4,500+
- Website: aerospace.org

The Aerospace Corporation is an American nonprofit corporation that operates a federally funded research and development center (FFRDC) providing independent technical oversight and objective analysis for U.S. national security space programs. The corporation provides technical guidance and advice on all aspects of space missions to military, civil, and commercial customers. Aerospace works closely with organizations such as the United States Space Force (USSF) and the National Reconnaissance Office (NRO) to provide "objective technical analyses and assessments for space programs that serve the national interest". Although the USSF and NRO are primary customers, Aerospace performs work for civil agencies such as NASA and NOAA as well as international organizations and governments in the national interest. Aerospace, as part of its charter, also provides expertise to commercial entities, both established companies and startups, domestically and abroad.

== History ==
On July 1, 1954, the Western Development Division (WDD) of the United States Air Force was established, under the command of Brigadier General Bernard A. Schriever. WDD was responsible for the development of the intercontinental ballistic missile. The Ramo-Wooldridge Corporation (RW) was identified as the civilian organization responsible for systems engineering for the ICBM program. Its Space Technology Laboratories (STL) handled all missile tasks. Despite early successes, both government and industry criticised RW's role as a systems engineer, particularly its privileged position with the Air Force. In 1958, RW merged with Thompson Products to become TRW, and the Space Technology Laboratories became an independent subsidiary of TRW, but concerns regarding conflicts of interest persisted. In September 1959, United States Congress issued House Report 1121 which recommended that STL be converted into a non-profit institution. Congress wanted the establishment of an organization, free from conflict of interest, to aid the Air Force in "applying the full resources of modern science and technology to the problem of achieving those continuing advances in ballistic missiles and military space systems."

On June 3, 1960, Aerospace was established under the laws of the State of California as a nonprofit corporation. On June 25, 1960, at a press conference held at the U.S. Air Force Ballistic Missile Division headquarters in El Segundo, California, Lt. Gen. Bernard A. Schriever announced the "formation of a new nonprofit organization, The Aerospace Corporation, to serve the Air Force in the scientific and technical planning and management of missile-space programs."

Among the earliest projects it supported were the Dyna-Soar orbital spaceplane, Project Mercury, and the man-rating of the Atlas (rocket) intercontinental ballistic missile. The Aerospace Corporation provided general systems engineering and technical direction for the Titan II missile, first tested in 1962, which became the launch vehicle for Project Gemini. Other notable projects of the 1960s include the advanced ballistic re-entry system (ABRES), the Air Force's Manned Orbiting Laboratory (MOL), the Defense Satellite Communications System (DSCS), and the Defense Support Program (DSP).

During the 1970s, Aerospace began performing advanced space program analysis and program studies for NASA's development of the Space Transportation System (STS), more commonly known as the Space Shuttle. Aerospace also began tests on airborne UHF terminals for the Air Force Satellite Communications System, AFSATCOM. In the mid-70s Aerospace assumed general systems engineering and integration responsibility for the Defense Meteorological Satellite Program (DMSP). Beginning in 1973, a program office was established to assist the Air Force in the creation of the Global Positioning System (GPS). In recognition of their GPS collaboration, Aerospace shared the 1992 Robert J. Collier Trophy, the nation's highest award for aeronautical achievement, "for the most significant development for safe and efficient navigation and surveillance of air and spacecraft since the introduction of radio navigation 50 years ago."

Throughout the 1980s, Aerospace supported the Inertial Upper Stage (IUS), the Strategic Defense Initiative (SDI), the Milstar and DSCS satellite communication systems, and antisatellite (ASAT) programs. They provided planning, design, and evaluation for the Air Force Satellite Control Network (AFSCN) and the Consolidated Space Operations Center at Schriever Air Force Base in Colorado. During this same time period, the company also provided systems engineering and integration for launch vehicles, including the Atlas, Titan II, Titan IV, and Delta II.

In the 1990s, Aerospace participated in the planning and development of system requirements for the Evolved Expendable Launch Vehicle (EELV) program, the next generation of launch vehicles. They continued to provide launch vehicle systems engineering for the Atlas II, Delta III, and Titan IVB. Satellite program support included Wideband Gapfiller, Space Based Laser, the Ultrahigh-Frequency Follow-On program, and the Global Broadcast Service. Throughout the second half of the 90s, the corporation conducted independent assessments for the International Space Station, provided technical support for the Cassini spacecraft, and supported the acquisition of the Space-Based Infrared System (SBIRS) satellite constellation.

Most recently, The Aerospace Corporation provided further technical assistance to EELV programs including the Atlas V and Delta IV, and supported planning for Space Radar to provide global persistent intelligence, surveillance, and reconnaissance to the Department of Defense. Aerospace has been involved in analysing concept designs for the Space Tracking and Surveillance System (SSTS). Aerospace plays an integral role in developing the Advanced Extremely High Frequency (AEHF) program, which will replace the Milstar system. Aerospace also supported the Transformational Satellite Communications System MILSATCOM architecture to link military and reconnaissance communication networks. However, it was canceled per the recommendations of Defense Secretary Robert M. Gates due to DoD budgetary constraints. Aerospace remains a significant partner in the continuing evolution of the GPS system. Aerospace has played a leading role in planning and acquiring Geostationary Operational Environmental Satellite for the National Oceanic and Atmospheric Administration. In 2005, Aerospace supported the Air Force Affordable Responsive Spacelift (ARES) launch system demonstration program.

== Capabilities ==
The Aerospace Corporation, as the FFRDC for national security space, primarily supports the United States Space Force's Space Systems Command as well as the National Reconnaissance Office. Their 50-year history working side by side with these organizations has made Aerospace the national memory and data repository for launch and satellite systems. They provide scientific and engineering support for launch, space, and related ground systems that serve the national interest.

The Department of Defense has identified five core competencies for the Aerospace FFRDC: launch certification, system-of-systems engineering, systems development and acquisition, process implementation, and technology application.

Aerospace also manages support to programs for NASA and the National Oceanic and Atmospheric Administration (NOAA), as well as other civil and some commercial space customers.

The Aerospace Corporation sponsors several annual conferences and workshops including planetary defense, space systems engineering, space power, and spacecraft thermal control.

== Organization ==
=== Engineering and Technology Group ===
The Engineering and Technology Group is Aerospace's core science and engineering organization, providing cross-program technical support to a variety of military, civil, commercial, and corporate projects. Consisting of nearly half of the company's technical force, the group is made up of six specialty organizations: Laboratory Operations, Communications and Networking Division, Computers and Software Division, Electronics and Sensors Division, Systems Engineering Division, Vehicle Systems Division. Members of ETG assess and evaluate existing and new space technologies, investigate and resolve anomalies, and conduct research and development.

=== National Systems Group ===
The National Systems Group is responsible for systems engineering and integrations support for NRO space programs. Through methods such as technical and engineering analyses, concept design studies, and direct on-site support, they provide planning, development, and deployment services for reconnaissance space systems. NSG's focus is to apply a systems engineering approach to national intelligence programs to provide objective technical recommendations and solutions.

=== Defense Systems Group ===
The Defense Systems Group provides customer support to all national-security space programs. Activities within the group include requirements analysis, cross-mission planning and architecture development, strategic awareness planning, cross-program engineering, and systems acquisition development.

The Defense Systems Group works with the Space Force and industry partners to develop military satellites and advanced national-security satellite systems. It oversees four major spacecraft and space system areas: communications, surveillance, weather, and navigation. Much emphasis is placed upon the life cycle for systems—as space programs are designed, acquired, and fielded. The Space Systems Group also includes Space Launch Operations which supports Air Force and NRO launch programs by monitoring and collecting data from national security launches. It is responsible for conducting the Aerospace independent launch readiness verification process for legacy and EELV launches. This group focuses on lessons learned, data, and best practices sharing among launch programs.

=== Civil Systems Group ===
The Civil Systems Group is a division of The Aerospace Corporation that supports both developing and operational civil space systems for NASA, the National Oceanic and Atmospheric Administration (NOAA), as well as addressing difficult systems engineering problems in the military, civil, and commercial applications. Commercially, the group supports satellite owner-operators, spacecraft manufacturers, insurance companies, and space-consulting and legal firms. It plays a key role in spacecraft operations, acquisition planning, strategic planning, acquisition management, and risk assessment for operational, near-term and future NOAA satellite programs.

=== Specialty Centers ===
==== Center for Orbital and Reentry Debris Studies ====
The company also maintains the Center for Orbital and Reentry Debris Studies (CORDS). The group is unique in that it is the only one that systematically tests fallen space debris in its laboratory, The size and shape of debris along with melting that occurs during reentry is analyzed with sophisticated computer software in an effort to reconstruct its fall. Information learned during analysis is used to help satellite developers "design for demise" or ensure that debris burns up more completely during reentry. The team received the 1992 NASA Group Achievement Award for their work on understanding the breakup characteristics of the Space Shuttle external tank.

==== Center for Space Policy and Strategy ====
The Center for Space Policy and Strategy was originally established in 2000 as a Center of Excellence for civil, commercial, and national space policy. In 2016, the Center was expanded.

== See also ==
- TRACE, a computer program developed by the Aerospace Corporation
