= Undercompressive shock wave =

An undercompressive shock wave is a shock wave that does not fulfill the Peter Lax conditions.

An undercompressive shock wave

A compressive, ordinary shock wave

== Details ==
Ordinary shock waves are compressive, that is, they fulfill the Lax conditions: the characteristic speed (in air, the speed of sound) behind the shock is greater than that of the shock itself, which is greater than the characteristic speed in front of the shock. The characteristic speed is the speed of small, travelling perturbations. These conditions seem to be necessary for a shock wave to remain and not decay. If the peak of a wave moves faster than at its base, then the wave front becomes self-sharpening and eventually becomes a nearly discontinuous shock, a sharp wave front which remains so when it travels.

A shock wave is undercompressive if the Lax conditions are not fulfilled. A sharp wave front may remain sharp whilst travelling even when perturbations behind the front travel slower than it.

An experiment can be made to show this with travelling liquid steps : a thick film is spread on a thin one. The liquid steps remain sharp when they travel because the spreading is enhanced by the Marangoni effect. Making little perturbations with the tip of a hair, one can see whether shock waves are compressive or undercompressive.

== Notes & references ==
- A.L. Bertozzi, A. Münch, X. Fanton, A.M. Cazabat, Contact Line Stability and "Undercompressive Shocks" in Driven Thin Film Flow, Physical Review Letters, Volume 81, Number 23, 7 December 1998, pp. 5169-5172
