= UMIST linear system =

Gas target diverter simulator

The UMIST Linear System (ULS) is a gas target divertor simulator located on the former UMIST campus of the University of Manchester in the UK. It enables physicists to study the recombination processes of a detached plasma in a hydrogen target chamber.

Research on detached plasma and on its recombination modes is of primary importance in order to design an appropriate divertor region in a future nuclear fusion power plant, where huge amounts of energy will be deposited by the fast-moving particles generated in the main reactor. The major goal of the ULS as for many other linear divertor simulators, is to reproduce the same temperature and density conditions of the scrape-off layer of a tokamak in a linear environment and therefore to make easier the study of its properties.

ULS has been used to analyze the molecular activation and the electron-ion recombination modes, and to determine the conditions for their activation: diffusive processes have also been considered. Research on these subjects is still ongoing, and understanding of the elementary processes involved in a detached plasma is still far from being satisfactory.
