= Understanding Physics =

Three-volume science book by Isaac Asimov

- Cover (1988 edition)
- Author: Isaac Asimov
- Language: English
- Genre: Non-fiction, Popular science
- Publisher: Walker and Company
- Publication date: 1966
- Publication place: United States
- Pages: 833
- ISBN: 0-88029-251-2

Understanding Physics (1966) is a popular science book written by Isaac Asimov (1920–1992). It is considered to be a reader-friendly informational guide regarding the fields of physics, written for lay people. It is one of several science guides by Asimov.

The book is divided into three volumes, each of which have also been published separately as books. They are:

- Volume I: Motion, Sound, and Heat
- Volume II: Light, Magnetism, and Electricity
- Volume III: The Electron, Proton, and Neutron

== Editions ==
- Asimov, Isaac (1966), Understanding Physics, Walker and Company.
  - 1988 reprint, New York: Buccaneer Books; ISBN 0-88029-251-2.
  - 1988 omnibus (single volume) reprint, Dorset Press; ISBN 0-88029-251-2.
  - 1993 omnibus (single volume) reprint, Barnes & Noble; ISBN 0-88029-251-2.
