= UMER =

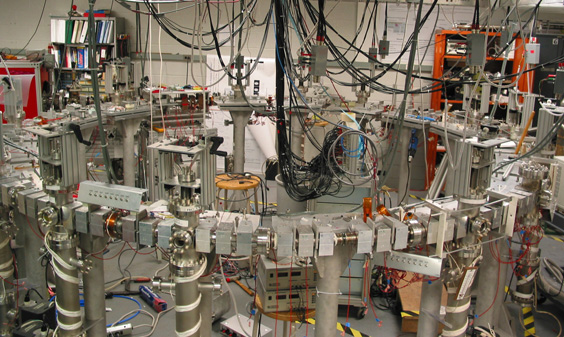
Photograph of the University of Maryland Electron Ring

The University of Maryland Electron Ring, or UMER, is a scaled electron beam accelerator located at the University of Maryland. The primary purpose of UMER is to investigate accelerator dynamics for beams with intense space charge, such as one finds in ion accelerators and photoinjectors. It deliberately enhances space charge forces by operating at low energies but relatively high currents.
