= Moving shock =

Shock wave travelling through a fluid

In fluid dynamics, a moving shock is a shock wave that is travelling through a fluid (often gaseous) medium with a velocity relative to the velocity of the fluid already making up the medium. As such, the normal shock relations require modification to calculate the properties before and after the moving shock. A knowledge of moving shocks is important for studying the phenomena surrounding detonation, among other applications.

== Theory ==
This diagram shows the gas-relative and shock-relative velocities used for the theoretical moving shock equations.

To derive the theoretical equations for a moving shock, one may start by denoting the region in front of the shock as subscript 1, with the subscript 2 defining the region behind the shock. This is shown in the figure, with the shock wave propagating to the right. The velocity of the gas is denoted by u, pressure by p, and the local speed of sound by a. The speed of the shock wave relative to the gas is W, making the total velocity equal to u_{1} + W.

Next, suppose a reference frame is then fixed to the shock so it appears stationary as the gas in regions 1 and 2 move with a velocity relative to it. Redefining region 1 as x and region 2 as y leads to the following shock-relative velocities:

$$\ u_y = W + u_1 - u_2,$$

$$\ u_x = W.$$

With these shock-relative velocities, the properties of the regions before and after the shock can be defined below introducing the temperature as T, the density as ρ, and the Mach number as M:

$$\ p_1 = p_x \quad ; \quad p_2 = p_y \quad ; \quad T_1 = T_x \quad ; \quad T_2 = T_y,$$

$$\ \rho_1 = \rho_x \quad ; \quad \rho_2 = \rho_y \quad ; \quad a_1 = a_x \quad ; \quad a_2 = a_y,$$

$$\ M_x = \frac{u_x}{a_x} = \frac{W}{a_1},$$

$$\ M_y = \frac{u_y}{a_y} = \frac{W + u_1 - u_2}{a_2}.$$

Introducing the heat capacity ratio as γ, the speed of sound, density, and pressure ratios can be derived:

$$\ \frac{a_2}{a_1} = \sqrt{1 + \frac{2(\gamma - 1)}{(\gamma + 1)^2}\left[\gamma M_x^2 - \frac{1}{M_x^2} - (\gamma - 1)\right]},$$

$$\ \frac{\rho_2}{\rho_1} = \frac{1}{1-\frac{2}{\gamma + 1}\left[1 - \frac{1}{M_x^2}\right]},$$

$$\ \frac{p_2}{p_1} = 1 + \frac{2\gamma}{\gamma + 1}\left[M_x^2 - 1\right].$$

One must keep in mind that the above equations are for a shock wave moving towards the right. For a shock moving towards the left, the x and y subscripts must be switched and:

$$\ u_y = W - u_1 + u_2,$$

$$\ M_y = \frac{W - u_1 + u_2}{a_2}.$$

== See also ==
- Bow shock (aerodynamics) – Curved propagating disturbance wave
- Compressible flow – Branch of fluid mechanics
- Gas dynamics – Branch of fluid mechanics
- Oblique shock – Shock wave that is inclined with respect to the incident upstream flow direction
- Prandtl-Meyer expansion fan – Phenomenon in fluid dynamics
