= APOPT =

- Developer: Advanced Process Solutions, LLC
- Stable release: 1.0.4 / October 1, 2021; 4 years ago
- Operating system: Cross-Platform
- Type: Technical computing
- License: Proprietary
- Website: apmonitor.com/apopt

APOPT (for Advanced Process OPTimizer) is a software package for solving large-scale optimization problems of any of these forms:

- Linear programming (LP)
- Quadratic programming (QP)
- Quadratically constrained quadratic program (QCQP)
- Nonlinear programming (NLP)
- Mixed integer programming (MIP)
- Mixed integer linear programming (MILP)
- Mixed integer nonlinear programming (MINLP)

Applications of the APOPT include chemical reactors, friction stir welding, prevention of hydrate formation in deep-sea pipelines, computational biology, solid oxide fuel cells, and flight controls for Unmanned Aerial Vehicles (UAVs).

== Benchmark Testing ==
Standard benchmarks such as CUTEr and SBML curated models are used to test the performance of APOPT relative to solvers BPOPT, IPOPT, SNOPT, and MINOS. A combination of APOPT (Active Set SQP) and BPOPT (Interior Point Method) performed the best on 494 benchmark problems for solution speed and total fraction of problems solved.

== See also ==
- APOPT is supported in AMPL, APMonitor, Gekko, Julia, MATLAB, Pyomo, and Python.
