= Minos (disambiguation) =

Minos was a mythical king of Crete.

Minos may also refer to:

- Minos (dialogue), one of the dialogues of Plato
- Palace of Minos, a Bronze Age archaeological site on Crete
- USS Minos, a tank landing ship
- Troides minos, the southern birdwing butterfly
- MINOS (optimization software), mathematical optimization software
- Minos EMI, a Greek record label formed by the merger of Minos Matsas & Son and EMIAL

== People ==
- J. Minos Simon (1922–2004), author, lecturer, aviator, and sportsman
- Minos Kokkinakis (1919–1999), Greek Jehovah's Witness
- Minos (rapper), South Korean rapper, under Soul Company

== Science ==
- 6239 Minos, an asteroid discovered in 1989
- MINOS, main injector neutrino oscillation search, a particle physics experiment to study neutrino phenomena
- Minos: Revista de Filología Egea, a journal on studies of Mycenaean Greek and Aegean scripts
- MINOS, an artificial intelligence project at Stanford Research Institute.
- MINOS (optimization software)

== Other ==
- Minos Prime, a boss from the 2020 video game Ultrakill
