= Michael Saunders (academic) =

American numerical analyst and computer scientist

Michael Alan Saunders
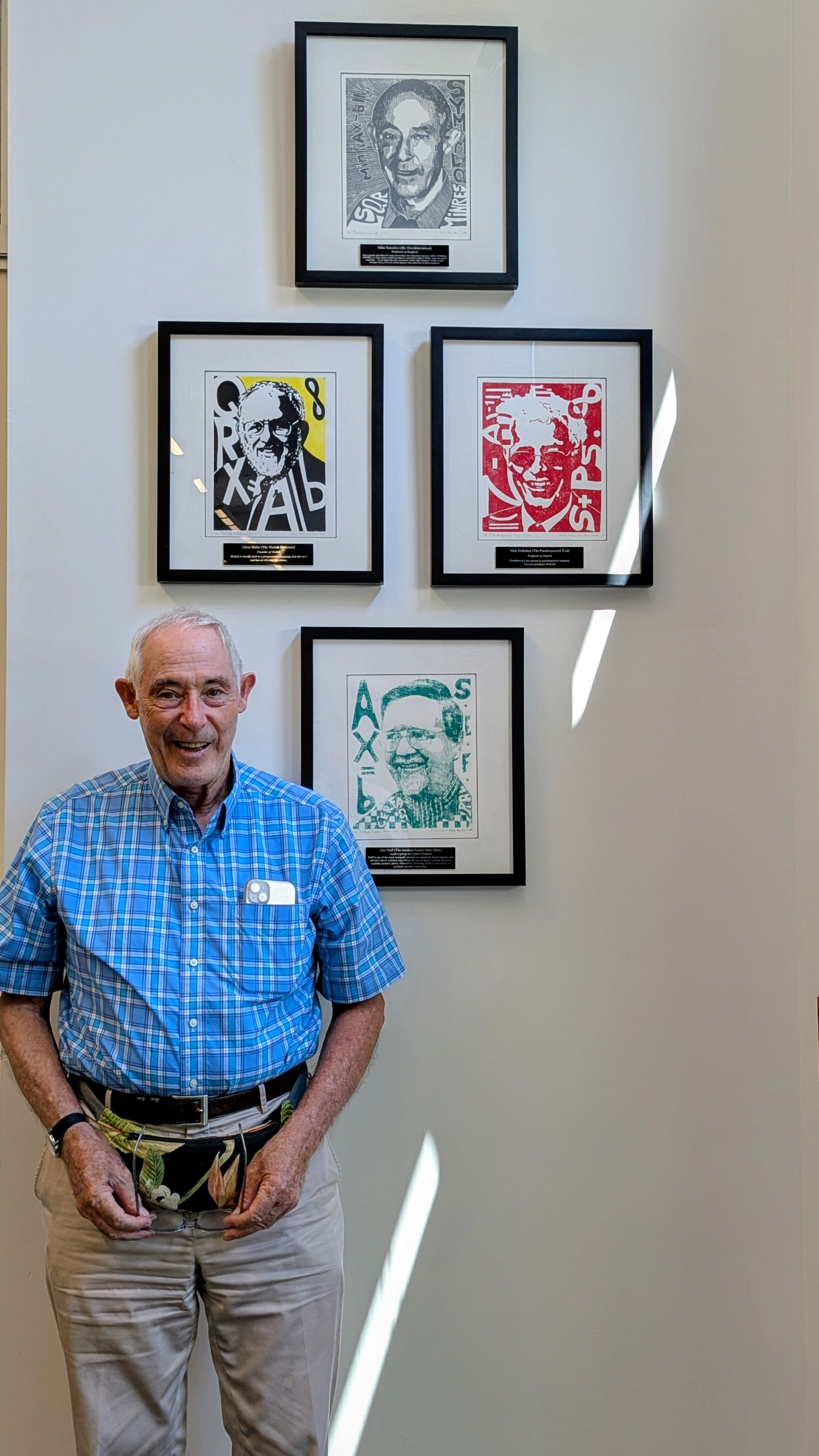
- Saunders at the Institute for Computational and Mathematical Engineering at Stanford University
- Born: 6 January 1944 (age 82); Christchurch, New Zealand
- Education: Stanford University; University of Canterbury
- Known for: MINOS, NPSOL, SNOPT
- Awards: Beale-Orchard-Hays Prize, SIAM Linear Algebra Prize
- Scientific career
- Fields: Computer Science, Mathematics
- Workplaces: Stanford University
- Doctoral advisor: Gene H. Golub

Michael Alan Saunders is a New Zealand American numerical analyst and computer scientist. He is a research professor of Management Science and Engineering at Stanford University. Saunders is known for his contributions to numerical linear algebra and numerical optimization and has developed many widely used software packages, such as MINOS, NPSOL, and SNOPT.

Saunders developed the MINRES method for the iterative solution of symmetric linear equation systems in 1975 together with Christopher Conway Paige.

== Education and career ==
Saunders was born on 6 January 1944 in Christchurch, New Zealand. He received his B.Sc. in mathematics from University of Canterbury in 1965 and worked for two years as a scientific officer at the Department of Scientific and Industrial Research (DSIR) in New Zealand. He received his Ph.D. in computer science from Stanford University in 1972, under the supervision of Gene Golub.

Saunders spent another two years at his old position with DSIR before joining the Systems Optimization Laboratory (SOL) in the Operations Research department at Stanford University. He was promoted to his current position in 1987 and made a faculty member in the Scientific Computing and Computational Mathematics (SCCM). He has authored over 100 scientific papers on a variety of topics, including many with his colleagues Philip Gill, Walter Murray, and Margaret Wright.

== Honors and awards ==
Saunders is a highly cited researcher in both computer science and mathematics on the ISI Web of Knowledge, an Honorary Fellow of the Royal Society of New Zealand, and a Society for Industrial and Applied Mathematics (SIAM) fellow. He has won the Mathematical Programming Society (MPS) Beale-Orchard Hays Prize, and is a cowinner of the SIAM Linear Algebra Prize with Sou-Cheng Choi and Christopher Paige.
