= Hedengren =

Hedengren is a surname. Notable people with the surname include:

- Jane Hedengren (born 2006), American middle- and long-distance runner
- John D. Hedengren (born 1977), American chemical engineer and ML researcher
- Lisa Hedengren (born 1992), Swedish ice hockey player
