= NLPQLP =

Fortran subroutine

The Fortran subroutine NLPQLP, a newer version of NLPQL, solves smooth nonlinear programming problems by a sequential quadratic programming (SQP) algorithm. The new version is specifically tuned to run under distributed systems. In case of computational errors, such as inaccurate function or gradient evaluations, a non-monotone line search is activated. The code is easily transformed to C by f2c and is widely used in academia and industry.
