= Michele Benzi =

Italian mathematician (born 1962)

- Born: 1962 (age 63–64); Bologna, Italy
- Awards: SIAM Fellow, Fellow of the American Mathematical Society, Member of Academia Europaea and Accademia dei Lincei

Academic background
- Education: University of Bologna
- Alma mater: North Carolina State University
- Thesis: A Direct Row-Projection Method for Sparse Linear Systems (1993)
- Doctoral advisor: Carl D. Meyer

Academic work
- Discipline: Computational mathematics
- Sub-discipline: Numerical linear algebra, Scientific computing, Network theory
- Institutions: Scuola Normale Superiore, Pisa
- Website: https://www.sns.it/it/persona/michele-benzi

Michele Benzi (born 1962 in Bologna) is an Italian mathematician who works as a full professor in the Scuola Normale Superiore in Pisa. He is known for his contributions to numerical linear algebra and its applications, especially to the solution of sparse linear systems and the study of preconditioners.

== Previous career ==
He worked as assistant professor at the University of Bologna from 1993 to 1996, then at Cerfacs in Toulouse from 1996 to 1997, and then at the Los Alamos National Laboratory for three years.

He transferred to the Emory University in Atlanta in 2000, where he held the endowed chair of Samuel Candler Dobbs professor starting from 2012 to 2018. Subsequently, he moved back to Italy to the Scuola Normale Superiore in Pisa as a full professor.

== Awards ==
Benzi was named a SIAM Fellow in 2012, and a fellow of the American Mathematical Society in 2018 "for his contributions in numerical linear algebra, exposition, and service to the profession". He was elected as a member of Academia Europaea in 2019.

He served as editor in chief of the SIAM Journal on Matrix Analysis and Applications from 2021 to 2026, and he is editor of approximately 20 journals. He won a SIAM Outstanding Paper Prize in 2001.

In 2026, he was elected to the Accademia dei Lincei in the category `Mathematics, Mechanics and Applications'.

== Selected publications ==
- Numerical solution of saddle point problems. M Benzi, GH Golub, J Liesen. Acta Numerica 14, 1-137
- Preconditioning techniques for large linear systems: a survey. M Benzi. Journal of Computational Physics 182 (2), 418-477
- A preconditioner for generalized saddle point problems. M Benzi, GH Golub. SIAM Journal on Matrix Analysis and Applications 26 (1), 20-41
- The physics of communicability in complex networks. E Estrada, N Hatano, M Benzi. Physics Reports 514 (3), 89-119
