= SIAM Journal on Discrete Mathematics =

- Discipline: Discrete mathematics
- Language: English
- Edited by: Stanislav Živný

Publication details
- History: 1988–present
- Publisher: Society for Industrial and Applied Mathematics
- Frequency: Quarterly
- Impact factor: 0.755 (2016)

Standard abbreviations
- ISO 4: SIAM J. Discrete Math.

Indexing
- CODEN: SJDMEC
- ISSN: 0895-4801 (print); 1095-7146 (web)
- LCCN: 88649131
- OCLC no.: 60648866

Links
- Journal homepage; Online access

SIAM Journal on Discrete Mathematics is a peer-reviewed mathematics journal published quarterly by the Society for Industrial and Applied Mathematics (SIAM). The journal includes articles on pure and applied discrete mathematics. It was established in 1988, along with the SIAM Journal on Matrix Analysis and Applications, to replace the SIAM Journal on Algebraic and Discrete Methods. The journal is indexed by Mathematical Reviews and Zentralblatt MATH. Its 2009 MCQ was 0.57. According to the Journal Citation Reports, the journal has a 2016 impact factor of 0.755.

Although its official ISO abbreviation is SIAM J. Discrete Math., its publisher and contributors frequently use the shorter abbreviation SIDMA.
