= Sequential linear-quadratic programming =

Sequential linear-quadratic programming (SLQP) is an iterative method for nonlinear optimization problems where objective function and constraints are twice continuously differentiable. Similarly to sequential quadratic programming (SQP), SLQP proceeds by solving a sequence of optimization subproblems. The difference between the two approaches is that:

- in SQP, each subproblem is a quadratic program, with a quadratic model of the objective subject to a linearization of the constraints
- in SLQP, two subproblems are solved at each step: a linear program (LP) used to determine an active set, followed by an equality-constrained quadratic program (EQP) used to compute the total step

This decomposition makes SLQP suitable to large-scale optimization problems, for which efficient LP and EQP solvers are available, these problems being easier to scale than full-fledged quadratic programs.

It may be considered related to, but distinct from, quasi-Newton methods.

== Algorithm basics ==
Consider a nonlinear programming problem of the form:

$$\begin{array}{rl}
\min\limits_{x} & f(x) \\
\mbox{s.t.} & b(x) \ge 0 \\
& c(x) = 0.
\end{array}$$

The Lagrangian for this problem is

$$\mathcal{L}(x,\lambda,\sigma) = f(x) - \lambda^T b(x) - \sigma^T c(x),$$

where $\lambda \ge 0$ and $\sigma$ are Lagrange multipliers.

=== LP phase ===
In the LP phase of SLQP, the following linear program is solved:

$$\begin{array}{rl}
\min\limits_{d} & f(x_k) + \nabla f(x_k)^Td\\
\mathrm{s.t.} & b(x_k) + \nabla b(x_k)^Td \ge 0 \\
& c(x_k) + \nabla c(x_k)^T d = 0. \end{array}$$

Let ${\cal A}_k$ denote the active set at the optimum $d^*_{\text{LP}}$ of this problem, that is to say, the set of constraints that are equal to zero at $d^*_{\text{LP}}$. Denote by $b_{{\cal A}_k}$ and $c_{{\cal A}_k}$ the sub-vectors of $b$ and $c$ corresponding to elements of ${\cal A}_k$.

=== EQP phase ===
In the EQP phase of SLQP, the search direction $d_k$ of the step is obtained by solving the following equality-constrained quadratic program:

$$\begin{array}{rl}
\min\limits_{d} & f(x_k) + \nabla f(x_k)^Td + \tfrac{1}{2} d^T \nabla_{xx}^2 \mathcal{L}(x_k,\lambda_k,\sigma_k) d\\
\mathrm{s.t.} & b_{{\cal A}_k}(x_k) + \nabla b_{{\cal A}_k}(x_k)^Td = 0 \\
& c_{{\cal A}_k}(x_k) + \nabla c_{{\cal A}_k}(x_k)^T d = 0. \end{array}$$

Note that the term $f(x_k)$ in the objective functions above may be left out for the minimization problems, since it is constant.

== See also ==
- Newton's method
- Secant method
- Sequential linear programming
- Sequential quadratic programming
