= Mathematical Programming =

- Discipline: Mathematics, Computer Science
- Language: English
- Edited by: Jon Lee (series A), Sven Leyffer (series B)

Publication details
- Former name(s): Mathematical Programming Studies
- History: 1972–present
- Publisher: Springer Science+Business Media
- Open access: Hybrid
- Impact factor: 2.823 (2019)

Standard abbreviations
- ISO 4: Math. Program.

Indexing
- ISSN: 0025-5610 (print); 1436-4646 (web)
- LCCN: 74618643
- OCLC no.: 1585989

Links
- Journal homepage; Online access

Mathematical Programming is a peer-reviewed scientific journal that was established in 1971 and is published by Springer Science+Business Media. It is the official journal of the Mathematical Optimization Society and consists of two series: A and B. The "A" series contains general publications, the "B" series focuses on topical mathematical programming areas. The editor-in-chief of Series A is Jon Lee (U Michigan); for Series B this is Sven Leyffer (Argonne).

== History ==
The journal has been published by Springer since January 1999. Mathematical Programming Studies is the predecessor of the Series B part of this journal.

== Abstracting and indexing ==
Mathematical Programming is abstracted and indexed in:

- ABI/INFORM
- ABS Academic Journal Quality Guide
- Academic OneFile
- Academic Search
- Compendex
- Computer Science Index
- Current Abstracts
- Current Contents/Physical, Chemical and Earth Sciences
- Current Index to Statistics
- Digital Bibliography & Library Project
- Digital Mathematics Registry
- GeoRef
- International Abstracts in Operations Research
- Mathematical Reviews
- PASCAL
- Science Citation Index
- Scopus
- TOC Premier
- VINITI Database RAS
- Zentralblatt MATH

According to the Journal Citation Reports, the journal has a 2010 impact factor of 1.970.
