= Michael Heath (computer scientist) =

American computer scientist

Michael T. Heath
- Born: December 11, 1946 (age 79)
- Education: Stanford University
- Scientific career
- Fields: Computer science
- Workplaces: University of Illinois at Urbana–Champaign
- Doctoral advisor: Gene H. Golub

Michael Thomas Heath (born December 11, 1946) is a retired computer scientist who specializes in scientific computing. He is the director of the Center for the Simulation of Advanced Rockets, a Department of Energy-sponsored computing center at the University of Illinois at Urbana–Champaign, and the former Fulton Watson Copp Professor of Computer Science at UIUC. Heath was inducted as member of the European Academy of Sciences in 2002, a Fellow of the Association for Computing Machinery in 2000, and a Fellow of the Society for Industrial and Applied Mathematics in 2010. He also received the 2009 Taylor L. Booth Education Award from IEEE. He became an emeritus professor in 2012.

Heath is the author of Scientific Computing: An Introductory Survey, an introductory text on numerical analysis.^{[H02]}

== Education ==
Michael Heath earned his BA in mathematics from the University of Kentucky in 1968. In 1974, Heath earned his MS in mathematics from the University of Tennessee. Heath earned his PhD in computer science from Stanford University in 1978; his PhD dissertation was entitled Numerical Algorithms for Nonlinearly Constrained Optimization and was completed under the direction of Gene Golub.^{[H78]}

== Early work ==
Prior to his work with the University of Illinois, Michael Heath spent a number of years at Oak Ridge National Laboratory. Heath joined Oak Ridge in 1968 as a Scientific Applications Programmer, and he became a Eugene P. Wigner Postdoctoral Fellow in 1978.

Michael Heath served as an adjunct professor of computer science at the University of Tennessee from 1988 to 1991. In 1991, Heath joined the University of Illinois, where he soon became a senior research scientist with the National Center for Supercomputing Applications.

== Selected publications ==
| H78. | "Numerical Algorithms for Nonlinearly Constrained Optimization". Stanford University (PhD dissertation). 1978. Archived from the original on February 27, 2012. |

| H02. | Heath, Michael T (2002). Scientific Computing: An Introductory Survey. McGraw-Hill. ISBN 978-0-07-239910-3. Archived from the original on 2006-09-06. |
