= John D. Hedengren =

American chemical engineer and ML researcher

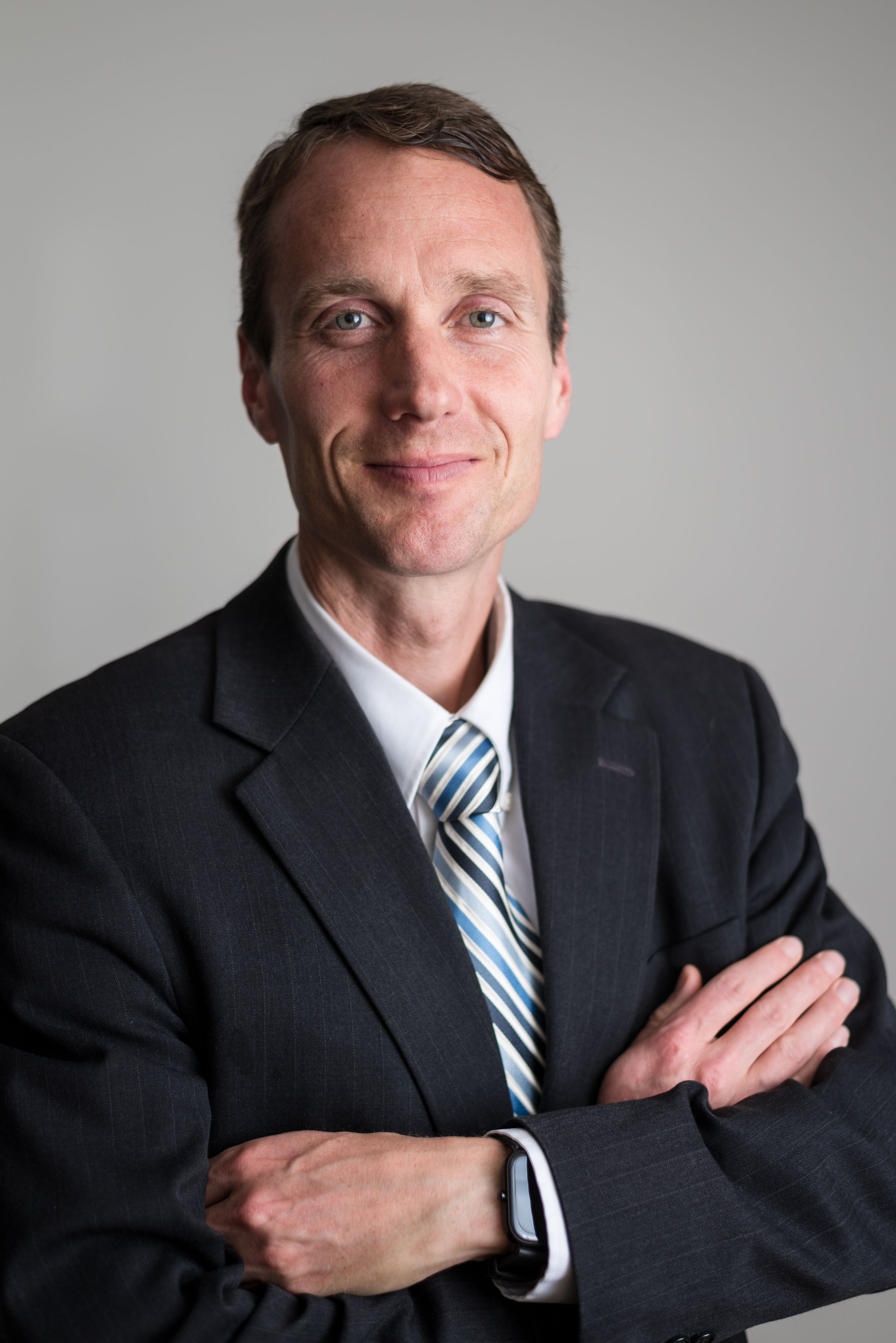
- Born: July 3, 1977 (age 47)
- Citizenship: United States
- Known for: process control, machine learning, optimization
- Scientific career
- Fields: Chemical engineering
- Website: BYU Faculty Profile

John D. Hedengren (born July 3, 1977) is an American chemical engineer, professor at Brigham Young University, and researcher known for his work in process control, dynamic optimization, and machine learning applications in engineering.

== Research and career ==
Hedengren has published on physics-informed machine learning for optimizing energy systems, unmanned aircraft, and drilling processes. His work includes the development of APMonitor Optimization Suite, Gekko Optimization Suite, and the Temperature Control Lab. Hedengren runs the APMonitor YouTube Channel with educational videos on control, optimization, and machine learning for engineers.

== Awards and honors ==
Hedengren has received several awards, including:

- 2014: AIChE David Himmelblau Award
- 2018: AIChE Computing Practice Award
- 2024: John R. Ragazzini Award, American Automatic Control Council
- 2025: Process Automation Hall of Fame

== Athletics ==
Hedengren earned NCAA All-American honors in Cross-Country and was named CoSIDA Academic All-America five times, more than any athlete in BYU history. He was inducted into the BYU Athletic Hall of Fame in 2015.
