= SIAM Journal on Matrix Analysis and Applications =

- Discipline: Matrix (mathematics)
- Language: English
- Edited by: Michele Benzi

Publication details
- Former name(s): SIAM Journal on Algebraic and Discrete Methods
- History: 1980–present
- Publisher: Society for Industrial and Applied Mathematics
- Frequency: Quarterly

Standard abbreviations
- ISO 4: SIAM J. Matrix Anal. Appl.

Indexing
- CODEN: SJMAEL
- ISSN: 0895-4798 (print); 1095-7162 (web)
- LCCN: 88649193
- OCLC no.: 465377721

Links
- Journal homepage; Online access; Online archive

The SIAM Journal on Matrix Analysis and Applications is a peer-reviewed scientific journal covering matrix analysis and its applications. The relevant applications include signal processing, systems and control theory, statistics, Markov chains, mathematical biology, graph theory, and data science.

The journal was originally established as the SIAM Journal on Algebraic and Discrete Methods in 1980, until it split into SIAM Journal on Discrete Mathematics and the current title in 1988.

The journal is published by the Society for Industrial and Applied Mathematics. The founding editor-in-chief was Gene H. Golub, who established the journal in 1980. The current editor is Michele Benzi (Scuola Normale Superiore).
