= Michael Overton =

American computer scientist

- Education: University of British Columbia, B.Sc, Stanford University, M.S., Ph.D. in computer science
- Scientific career
- Fields: Computer science
- Workplaces: Courant Institute of Mathematical Sciences, New York University
- Doctoral advisor: Gene Golub

Michael L. Overton is an American computer scientist and mathematician. He is the Silver Professor of Computer Science and former Chair of the Computer Science department at Courant Institute of Mathematical Sciences, New York University. His research interests are in Numerical Analysis, Optimization, and Scientific Computing.

== Education and career ==
Overton received his B.Sc. in Computer Science from the University of British Columbia in 1974 and received his Ph.D. in computer science from Stanford University in 1979, under the supervision of Gene Golub. He joined the Computer Science Department at Courant Institute of Mathematical Sciences, New York University soon after that, and served as its chair. He was the editor-in-chief of the SIAM Journal on Optimization from 1995 to 1999 and is an inaugural SIAM Fellow.

== Works ==
- Numerical Computing with IEEE Floating Point Arithmetic, SIAM, 2001.
