= Successive linear programming =

Approximation for nonlinear optimization

Successive Linear Programming (SLP), also known as Sequential Linear Programming, is an optimization technique for approximately solving nonlinear optimization problems. It is related to, but distinct from, quasi-Newton methods.

Starting at some estimate of the optimal solution, the method is based on solving a sequence of first-order approximations (i.e. linearizations) of the model. The linearizations are linear programming problems, which can be solved efficiently. As the linearizations need not be bounded, trust regions or similar techniques are needed to ensure convergence in theory.

SLP has been used widely in the petrochemical industry since the 1970s. Since then, however, they have been superseded by sequential quadratic programming methods. While solving a QP subproblem takes more time than solving an LP one, the overall decrease in the number of iterations, due to improved convergence, results in significantly lower running times and fewer function evaluations."

== See also ==
- Sequential quadratic programming
- Sequential linear-quadratic programming
- Augmented Lagrangian method

== Sources ==
- Nocedal, Jorge; Wright, Stephen J. (2006). Numerical Optimization (2nd ed.). Berlin, New York: Springer-Verlag. ISBN 978-0-387-30303-1.
- Bazaraa, Mokhtar S.; Sherali, Hanif D.; Shetty, C.M. (1993). Nonlinear Programming, Theory and Applications (2nd ed.). John Wiley & Sons. ISBN 0-471-55793-5.
- Palacios-Gomez, F.; Lasdon, L.; Enquist, M. (October 1982). "Nonlinear Optimization by Successive Linear Programming". Management Science. 28 (10): 1106–1120. doi:10.1287/mnsc.28.10.1106.
