= Gene H. Golub =

American mathematician (1932–2007)

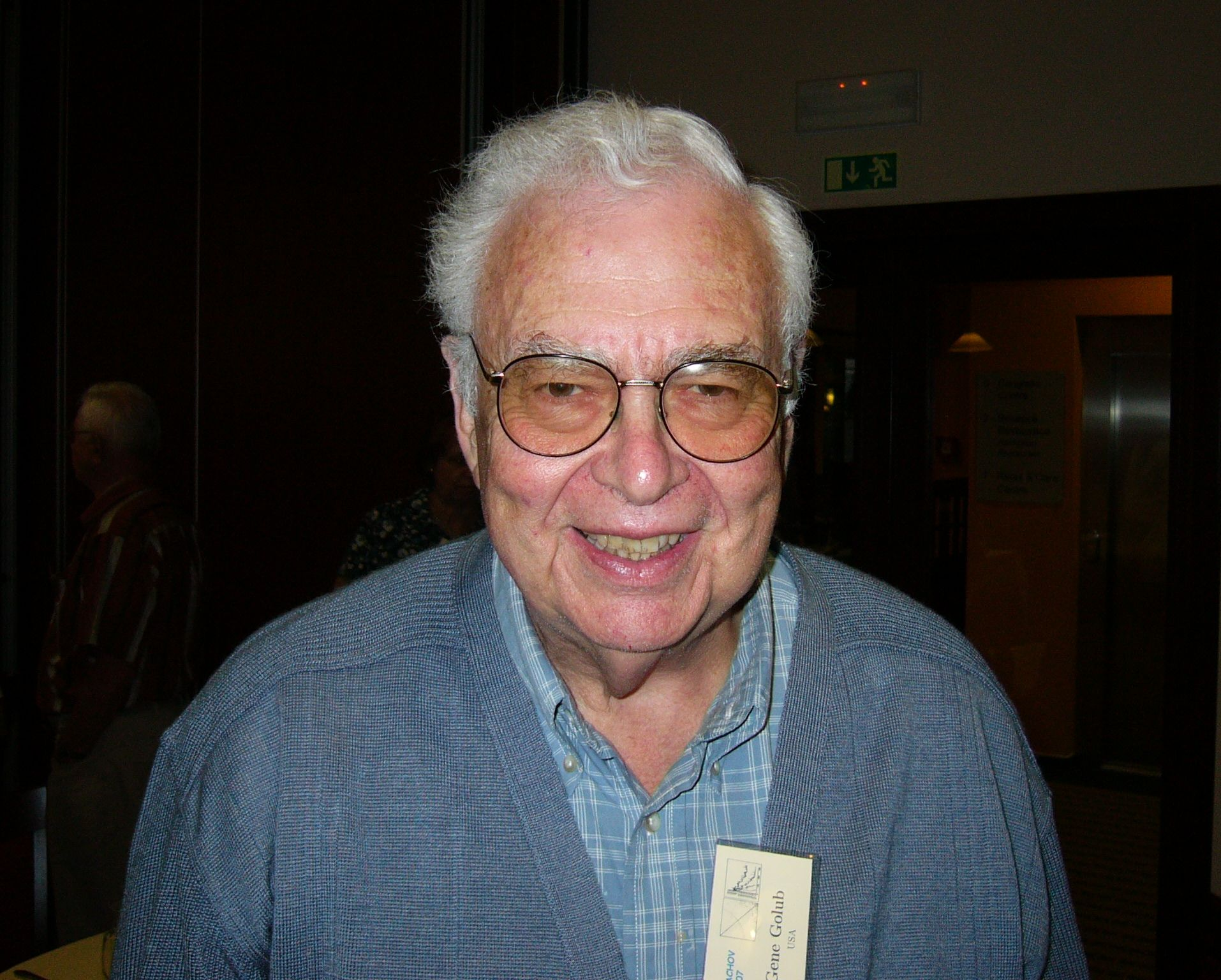
- Gene Golub in 2007
- Born: February 29, 1932; Chicago, Illinois, US
- Died: November 16, 2007 (aged 75); Stanford, California, US
- Education: University of Illinois at Urbana-Champaign
- Scientific career
- Fields: Computer science
- Workplaces: Stanford University
- Doctoral advisor: Abraham Taub
- Doctoral students: Richard P. Brent; Michael Heath; Dianne O'Leary; Michael Overton; Michael Saunders; Margaret H. Wright

Gene Howard Golub (February 29, 1932 – November 16, 2007), was an American numerical analyst who taught at Stanford University as Fletcher Jones Professor of Computer Science and held a courtesy appointment in electrical engineering.

== Personal life ==
Born in Chicago, he was educated at the University of Illinois at Urbana-Champaign, receiving his B.S. (1953), M.A. (1954) and Ph.D. (1959) all in mathematics. His M.A. degree was more specifically in Mathematical Statistics. His PhD dissertation was entitled "The Use of Chebyshev Matrix Polynomials in the Iterative Solution of Linear Equations Compared to the Method of Successive Overrelaxation" and his thesis adviser was Abraham Taub. Gene Golub succumbed to acute myeloid leukemia on the morning of 16 November 2007 at the Stanford Hospital.

== Stanford University ==
He arrived at Stanford in 1962 and became a professor there in 1970. He advised more than thirty doctoral students, many of whom have themselves achieved distinction. Gene Golub was an important figure in numerical analysis and pivotal to creating the NA-Net and the NA-Digest, as well as the International Congress on Industrial and Applied Mathematics.

One of his best-known books is Matrix Computations, co-authored with Charles F. Van Loan. He was a major contributor to algorithms for matrix decompositions. In particular he published an algorithm together with William Kahan in 1970 that made the computation of the singular value decomposition (SVD) feasible and that is still used today. A survey of his work was published in 2007 by Oxford University Press as "Milestones in Matrix Computation".

== Recognition ==
Golub was awarded the B. Bolzano Gold Medal for Merits in the Field of Mathematical Sciences and was one of the few elected to three national academies: the National Academy of Sciences (1993), the National Academy of Engineering (1990), and the American Academy of Arts and Sciences (1994). He was also a Foreign Member of the Royal Swedish Academy of Engineering Sciences (1986).

He is listed as an ISI highly cited researcher. He held 11 honorary doctorates and was scheduled to receive an honorary doctorate from ETH Zürich on November 17, 2007. He was a visiting professor at Princeton (1970), MIT (1979), ETH (1974 & 2002), and Oxford (1982, 1998 & 2007).

Gene Golub served as the president of the Society for Industrial and Applied Mathematics (SIAM) from 1985 to 1987 and was founding editor of both the SIAM Journal on Scientific Computing (SISC) and the SIAM Journal on Matrix Analysis and Applications (SIMAX).

== Selected publications ==
=== Articles ===
- Golub, Gene H. (1962). "Bounds for eigenvalues of tridiagonal symmetric matrices computed by the LR method". Mathematics of Computation. 16 (80): 438. doi:10.1090/S0025-5718-1962-0163430-6.
- Golub, Gene H. (1965). "Numerical methods for solving linear least squares problems". Numerische Mathematik. 7 (3): 206–216. doi:10.1007/BF01436075. hdl:10338.dmlcz/102951. S2CID 121494138.
- Golub, Gene H.; Welsch, John H. (1969). "Calculation of Gauss quadrature rules". Mathematics of Computation. 23 (106): 221. doi:10.1090/S0025-5718-69-99647-1.
- Golub, G. H.; Reinsch, C. (1971). "Singular Value Decomposition and Least Squares Solutions". Linear Algebra. pp. 134–151. doi:10.1007/978-3-662-39778-7_10. ISBN 978-3-662-38854-9.
- Golub, Gene H. (1973). "Some Modified Matrix Eigenvalue Problems". SIAM Review. 15 (2): 318–334. doi:10.1137/1015032.
- Golub, G. H.; Pereyra, V. (1973). "The Differentiation of Pseudo-Inverses and Nonlinear Least Squares Problems Whose Variables Separate". SIAM Journal on Numerical Analysis. 10 (2): 413–432. Bibcode:1973SJNA...10..413G. doi:10.1137/0710036.
- Björck, Åke; Golub, Gene H. (1973). "Numerical methods for computing angles between linear subspaces". Mathematics of Computation. 27 (123): 579. doi:10.1090/S0025-5718-1973-0348991-3.
- Gill, P. E.; Golub, G. H.; Murray, W.; Saunders, M. A. (1974). "Methods for modifying matrix factorizations". Mathematics of Computation. 28 (126): 505. doi:10.1090/S0025-5718-1974-0343558-6.
- Fischer, D.; Golub, G.; Hald, O.; Leiva, C.; Widlund, O. (1974). "On Fourier-Toeplitz methods for separable elliptic problems". Mathematics of Computation. 28 (126): 349. doi:10.1090/S0025-5718-1974-0415995-2.
- Golub, Gene H.; Heath, Michael; Wahba, Grace (1979). "Generalized Cross-Validation as a Method for Choosing a Good Ridge Parameter". Technometrics. 21 (2): 215–223. doi:10.1080/00401706.1979.10489751.
- Golub, Gene H.; Van Loan, Charles F. (1980). "An Analysis of the Total Least Squares Problem". SIAM Journal on Numerical Analysis. 17 (6): 883–893. Bibcode:1980SJNA...17..883G. doi:10.1137/0717073. hdl:1813/6251.
- Boley, Daniel; Golub, Gene H. (1984). "A modified method for reconstructing periodic Jacobi matrices". Mathematics of Computation. 42 (165): 143. doi:10.1090/S0025-5718-1984-0725989-1.
- Elman, Howard C.; Golub, Gene H. (1990). "Iterative methods for cyclically reduced nonselfadjoint linear systems". Mathematics of Computation. 54 (190): 671. Bibcode:1990MaCom..54..671E. doi:10.1090/S0025-5718-1990-1011442-X.
- Fischer, Bernd; Golub, Gene H. (1991). "On generating polynomials which are orthogonal over several intervals". Mathematics of Computation. 56 (194): 711. Bibcode:1991MaCom..56..711F. doi:10.1090/S0025-5718-1991-1068818-5.
- Elman, Howard C.; Golub, Gene H. (1991). "Iterative methods for cyclically reduced nonselfadjoint linear systems. II". Mathematics of Computation. 56 (193): 215. Bibcode:1991MaCom..56..215E. doi:10.1090/S0025-5718-1991-1052093-1.
- Golub, Gene H.; Meurant, Gérard (1994). "Matrices, Moments and Quadrature". In: David F. Griffiths, G. Alistair Watson (eds.): Numerical analysis 1993. Proceedings of the 15th Dundee Conference, June–July 1993. Pitman Research Notes in Mathematics Series. vol. 303. Harlow: Longman Scientific & Technical. pp. 105–156. ISBN 0-582-22568-X.
- Chan, Tony F.; Golub, Gene H.; Mulet, Pep (1999). "A Nonlinear Primal-Dual Method for Total Variation-Based Image Restoration". SIAM Journal on Scientific Computing. 20 (6): 1964–1977. Bibcode:1999SJSC...20.1964C. doi:10.1137/S1064827596299767.
- Calvetti, D.; Golub, G. H.; Gragg, W. B.; Reichel, L. (2000). "Computation of Gauss-Kronrod quadrature rules". Mathematics of Computation. 69 (231): 1035–1053. Bibcode:2000MaCom..69.1035C. doi:10.1090/S0025-5718-00-01174-1.
- Kamvar, Sepandar D.; Haveliwala, Taher H.; Manning, Christopher D.; Golub, Gene H. (2003). "Extrapolation methods for accelerating Page Rank computations". Proceedings of the twelfth international conference on World Wide Web - WWW '03. p. 261. doi:10.1145/775152.775190. ISBN 1581136803. S2CID 5645394.
- Bai, Zhong-Zhi; Golub, Gene H.; Ng, Michael K. (2003). "Hermitian and Skew-Hermitian Splitting Methods for Non-Hermitian Positive Definite Linear Systems". SIAM Journal on Matrix Analysis and Applications. 24 (3): 603–626. doi:10.1137/S0895479801395458.
- Alter, Orly; Golub, Gene H. (2004). "Integrative analysis of genome-scale data by using pseudoinverse projection predicts novel correlation between DNA replication and RNA transcription". Proceedings of the National Academy of Sciences. 101 (47): 16577–16582. Bibcode:2004PNAS..10116577A. doi:10.1073/pnas.0406767101. PMC 534520. PMID 15545604.
- Alter, Orly; Golub, Gene H. (2005). "Reconstructing the pathways of a cellular system from genome-scale signals by using matrix and tensor computations". Proceedings of the National Academy of Sciences. 102 (49): 17559–17564. Bibcode:2005PNAS..10217559A. doi:10.1073/pnas.0509033102. PMC 1308929. PMID 16314560.
- Benzi, Michele; Golub, Gene H.; Liesen, Jörg (2005). "Numerical solution of saddle point problems". Acta Numerica. 14: 1–137. Bibcode:2005AcNum..14....1B. doi:10.1017/S0962492904000212. S2CID 122717775.
- Alter, Orly; Golub, Gene H. (2006). "Singular value decomposition of genome-scale mRNA lengths distribution reveals asymmetry in RNA gel electrophoresis band broadening". Proceedings of the National Academy of Sciences. 103 (32): 11828–11833. Bibcode:2006PNAS..10311828A. doi:10.1073/pnas.0604756103. PMC 1524674. PMID 16877539.
- Omberg, Larsson; Golub, Gene H.; Alter, Orly (2007). "A tensor higher-order singular value decomposition for integrative analysis of DNA microarray data from different studies". Proceedings of the National Academy of Sciences. 104 (47): 18371–18376. Bibcode:2007PNAS..10418371O. doi:10.1073/pnas.0709146104. PMC 2147680. PMID 18003902.
- Bai, Zhong-Zhi; Golub, Gene H.; Li, Chi-Kwong (2007). "Convergence properties of preconditioned Hermitian and skew-Hermitian splitting methods for non-Hermitian positive semidefinite matrices". Mathematics of Computation. 76 (257): 287–299. Bibcode:2007MaCom..76..287B. doi:10.1090/S0025-5718-06-01892-8.

=== Books ===
- with Charles Van Loan: Matrix Computations (= Johns Hopkins Series in the Mathematical Sciences. 3). Johns Hopkins University Press, Baltimore MD 1983, ISBN 0-8018-3010-9; 2nd edition 1989; 3rd edition 1996; 4th edition 2013
- Studies in Numerical Analysis. Mathematical Association of America, 1985, 426 pages.
- with James M. Ortega: Scientific Computing and Differential Equations. An Introduction to Numerical Methods. Academic Press, Boston MA etc. 1992, ISBN 0-12-289255-0.
- with James M. Ortega: Scientific Computing: An Introduction with Parallel Computing. Academic Press, 1993; 2014 pbk reprint
- with Moody T. Chu: Inverse Eigenvalue problems. Theory, algorithms, and applications. Oxford University Press, Oxford etc. 2005, ISBN 0-19-856664-6.
- Milestones in Matrix Computation: The Selected Works of Gene H. Golub with Commentaries. Oxford University Press, 2007.
- with Gérard Meurant: Matrices, Moments and Quadrature with Applications. Princeton University Press, 2009, ISBN 1-4008-3388-4
