= Sven Leyffer =

American computational mathematician

Sven Leyffer is an American computational mathematician specializing in nonlinear optimization. He is a Senior Computational Mathematician in the Laboratory for Applied Mathematics, Numerical Software, and Statistics at Argonne National Laboratory.

== Education ==
Leyffer received a Vordiplom in Pure and Applied Mathematics from the University of Hamburg in 1989. Leyffer obtained his Ph.D. in 1994 from the University of Dundee under doctoral advisor Roger Fletcher. His dissertation was Deterministic Methods in Mixed Integer Nonlinear Programming.

== Recognition ==
In 2006, Leyffer was awarded, alongside Roger Fletcher and Philippe L. Toint, the Lagrange Prize from the Mathematical Programming Society (MPS) and the Society for Industrial and Applied Mathematics (SIAM).

In 2009, Leyffer was named a Fellow of the Society for Industrial and Applied Mathematics (SIAM) for contributions to large-scale nonlinear optimization.

== Service ==
From 2017 to 2021, Leyffer was editor-in-chief of the journal Mathematical Programming B.

Leyffer is president (2023–2024) of the Society for Industrial and Applied Mathematics (SIAM).
