= Sequential quadratic programming =

Optimization algorithm

Sequential quadratic programming (SQP) is an iterative method for constrained nonlinear optimization, also known as Lagrange-Newton method. SQP methods are used on mathematical problems for which the objective function and the constraints are twice continuously differentiable, but not necessarily convex.

SQP methods solve a sequence of optimization subproblems, each of which optimizes a quadratic model of the objective subject to a linearization of the constraints. If the problem is unconstrained, then the method reduces to Newton's method for finding a point where the gradient of the objective vanishes. If the problem has only equality constraints, then the method is equivalent to applying Newton's method to the first-order optimality conditions, or Karush–Kuhn–Tucker conditions, of the problem.

== Algorithm basics ==
Overview schematic illustrating the basic SQP algorithm

Consider a nonlinear programming problem of the form:

$$\begin{array}{rl}
\min\limits_{x} & f(x) \\
\mbox{subject to} & h(x) \ge 0 \\
& g(x) = 0.
\end{array}$$

where $x \in \mathbb{R}^n$, $f: \mathbb{R}^n \rightarrow \mathbb{R}$, $h: \mathbb{R}^n \rightarrow \mathbb{R}^{m_I}$ and $g: \mathbb{R}^n \rightarrow \mathbb{R}^{m_E}$.

The Lagrangian for this problem is

$$\mathcal{L}(x,\lambda,\sigma) = f(x) + \lambda h(x) + \sigma g(x),$$

where $\lambda$ and $\sigma$ are Lagrange multipliers.

=== The equality constrained case ===
If the problem does not have inequality constraints (that is, $m_I = 0$), the first-order optimality conditions (aka KKT conditions) $\nabla \mathcal{L}(x, \sigma) = 0$ are a set of nonlinear equations that may be iteratively solved with Newton's Method. Newton's method linearizes the KKT conditions at the current iterate $\left[x_k, \sigma_k \right]^T$, which provides the following expression for the Newton step $\left[d_x, d_\sigma \right]^T$:

$$\begin{bmatrix}
d_x \\
d_\sigma
\end{bmatrix}
= -[\nabla_{xx}^2 \mathcal{L}(x_k, \sigma_k)]^{-1} \nabla_x \mathcal{L}(x_k, \sigma_k)
= -
\begin{bmatrix}
\nabla^2_{xx} \mathcal{L}(x_k, \sigma_k) & \nabla g(x_k) \\
\nabla g^{T}(x_k) & 0
\end{bmatrix}^{-1}
\begin{bmatrix}
\nabla f(x_k) + \sigma_k \nabla g(x_k) \\
g(x_k)
\end{bmatrix}$$,

where $\nabla^2_{xx} \mathcal{L}(x_k, \sigma_k)$ denotes the Hessian matrix of the Lagrangian, and $d_x$ and $d_\sigma$ are the primal and dual displacements, respectively. Note that the Lagrangian Hessian is not explicitly inverted and a linear system is solved instead.

When the Lagrangian Hessian $\nabla^2 \mathcal{L}(x_k, \sigma_k)$ is not positive definite, the Newton step may not exist or it may characterize a stationary point that is not a local minimum (but rather, a local maximum or a saddle point). In this case, the Lagrangian Hessian must be regularized, for example one can add a multiple of the identity to it such that the resulting matrix is positive definite.

An alternative view for obtaining the primal-dual displacements is to construct and solve a local quadratic model of the original problem at the current iterate:

$\begin{array}{rl} \min\limits_{d_x} & f(x_k) + \nabla f(x_k)^T d_x + \frac{1}{2} d_x^T \nabla^2_{xx} \mathcal{L}(x_k, \sigma_k) d_x \\ \mathrm{s.t.} & g(x_k) + \nabla g(x_k)^T d_x = 0. \end{array}$

The optimality conditions of this quadratic problem correspond to the linearized KKT conditions of the original problem. Note that the term $f(x_k)$ in the expression above may be left out, since it is constant under the $\min\limits_{d}$ operator.

=== The inequality constrained case ===
In the presence of inequality constraints ($m_I > 0$), we can naturally extend the definition of the local quadratic model introduced in the previous section:

$\begin{array}{rl} \min\limits_{d} & f(x_k) + \nabla f(x_k)^Td + \frac{1}{2} d^T \nabla^2_{xx} \mathcal{L}(x_k, \lambda_k, \sigma_k) d \\ \mathrm{s.t.} & h(x_k) + \nabla h(x_k)^T d \ge 0 \\ & g(x_k) + \nabla g(x_k)^T d = 0. \end{array}$

=== The SQP algorithm ===
The SQP algorithm starts from the initial iterate $(x_0, \lambda_0, \sigma_0)$. At each iteration, the QP subproblem is built and solved; the resulting Newton step direction $[d_x, d_\lambda, d_\sigma]^T$ is used to update current iterate:

$\left[ x_{k+1}, \lambda_{k+1}, \sigma_{k+1} \right]^T = \left[ x_{k}, \lambda_{k}, \sigma_{k} \right]^T + [d_x, d_\lambda, d_\sigma]^T.$

This process is repeated for $k = 0, 1, 2, \ldots$ until some convergence criterion is satisfied.

== Practical implementations ==
Practical implementations of the SQP algorithm are significantly more complex than its basic version above. To adapt SQP for real-world applications, the following challenges must be addressed:

- The possibility of an infeasible QP subproblem.
- QP subproblem yielding a bad step: one that either fails to reduce the target or increases constraints violation.
- Breakdown of iterations due to significant deviation of the target/constraints from their quadratic/linear models.

To overcome these challenges, various strategies are typically employed:

- Use of merit functions, which assess progress towards a constrained solution, non-monotonic steps or filter methods.
- Trust region or line search methods to manage deviations between the quadratic model and the actual target.
- Special feasibility restoration phases to handle infeasible subproblems, or the use of L1-penalized subproblems to gradually decrease infeasibility

These strategies can be combined in numerous ways, resulting in a diverse range of SQP methods.

== Alternative approaches ==
- Sequential linear programming
- Sequential linear-quadratic programming
- Augmented Lagrangian method

== Implementations ==
SQP methods have been implemented in well known numerical environments such as MATLAB and GNU Octave. There also exist numerous software libraries, including open source:

- SciPy (de facto standard for scientific Python) has scipy.optimize.minimize(method='SLSQP') solver.
- NLopt (C/C++ implementation, with numerous interfaces including Julia, Python, R, MATLAB/Octave), implemented by Dieter Kraft as part of a package for optimal control, and modified by S. G. Johnson.
- ALGLIB SQP solver (C++, C#, Java, Python API)
- acados (C with interfaces to Python, MATLAB, Simulink, Octave) implements a SQP method tailored to the problem structure arising in optimal control, but tackles also general nonlinear programs.

and commercial

- LabVIEW
- KNITRO (C, C++, C#, Java, Python, Julia, Fortran)
- NPSOL (Fortran)
- SNOPT (Fortran)
- NLPQL (Fortran)
- MATLAB
- SuanShu (Java)

== See also ==
- Newton's method
- Secant method
- Model Predictive Control
