= Charles F. Van Loan =

American computer scientist

- Education: University of Michigan
- Spouse: Marian Van Loan
- Children: Theodore Van Loan, Elizabeth Van Loan
- Scientific career
- Fields: Mathematics, computer science

Charles Francis Van Loan is an emeritus professor of computer science, formerly the Joseph C. Ford Professor of Engineering at Cornell University, He is known for his expertise in numerical analysis, especially matrix computations.

In 2016, Van Loan became the dean of faculty at Cornell University.

== Biography ==
Van Loan attended the University of Michigan, where he obtained a B.S. in applied mathematics (1969) and the M.A. (1970) and Ph.D. (1973) in mathematics. His PhD dissertation was entitled "Generalized Singular Values with Algorithms and Applications", and his thesis adviser was Cleve Moler. Following a postdoctorate at the University of Manchester, he joined the Department of Computer Science at Cornell University in 1975, and served as the department chair from 1999 to 2006.

During the 1988–1989 academic year, Van Loan taught at Oxford University for his sabbatical.

Van Loan ran the Computer Science Graduate Program from 1982 to 1987 at Cornell, and was the director of the Undergraduate Studies from 1994 to 1998 and 1999 to 2003. He was awarded the Ford chair in 1998. He held the position of chairman from July 1999 to June 2006.

In the spring of 2016, Van Loan retired from the Computer Science Department and was promoted to dean of faculty, replacing Joseph Burns. Van Loan was the first emeritus professor to hold this position.

Van Loan is retired and lives with his wife, Marian in Brunswick, Maine.

== Honors and awards ==
Van Loan won the Robert Paul Advising Award in 1998 and the James and Martha D. McCormick Advising Award in 2003. Other awards include the Merrill Scholar Faculty Impact Award in 1998 and 2009, and the James and Mary Tien Teaching Award, College of Engineering in 2009.

In 2018, he was awarded the John von Neumann Lecture prize by the Society for Industrial and Applied Mathematics.

== Books ==
Van Loan's best-known book is Matrix Computations, 3/e (Johns Hopkins University Press, 1996, ISBN 978-0-8018-5414-9), written with Gene H. Golub. He is also the author of Handbook for Matrix Computations (SIAM, 1988, ISBN 0-89871-227-0), Computational Frameworks for the Fast Fourier Transform (SIAM, 1992, ISBN 0-89871-285-8), Introduction to Computational Science and Mathematics (Jones and Bartlett, 1996, ISBN 0-86720-473-7), and Introduction to Scientific Computation: A Matrix-Vector Approach Using MATLAB (2nd ed., Prentice-Hall, 1999, ISBN 0-13-949157-0). His latest book is Insight Through Computing: A MATLAB Introduction to Computational Science and Engineering (SIAM, 2009, ISBN 978-0-89871-691-7), written with K-Y Daisy Fan.
