= APMonitor =

Modelling language for algebraic equations

- Developer: APMonitor
- Stable release: v1.0.1 / January 31, 2022
- Operating system: Cross-platform
- Type: Technical computing
- License: Proprietary, BSD
- Website: APMonitor product page
- Repository: https://github.com/APMonitor/

Advanced process monitor (APMonitor) is a modeling language for differential algebraic (DAE) equations. It is a free web-service or local server for solving representations of physical systems in the form of implicit DAE models. APMonitor is suited for large-scale problems and solves linear programming, integer programming, nonlinear programming, nonlinear mixed integer programming, dynamic simulation, moving horizon estimation, and nonlinear model predictive control. APMonitor does not solve the problems directly, but calls nonlinear programming solvers such as APOPT, BPOPT, IPOPT, MINOS, and SNOPT. The APMonitor API provides exact first and second derivatives of continuous functions to the solvers through automatic differentiation and in sparse matrix form.

== Programming language integration ==
Julia, MATLAB, Python are mathematical programming languages that have APMonitor integration through web-service APIs. The GEKKO Optimization Suite is a recent extension of APMonitor with complete Python integration. The interfaces are built-in optimization toolboxes or modules to both load and process solutions of optimization problems. APMonitor is an object-oriented modeling language and optimization suite that relies on programming languages to load, run, and retrieve solutions. APMonitor models and data are compiled at run-time and translated into objects that are solved by an optimization engine such as APOPT or IPOPT. The optimization engine is not specified by APMonitor, allowing several different optimization engines to be switched out. The simulation or optimization mode is also configurable to reconfigure the model for dynamic simulation, nonlinear model predictive control, moving horizon estimation or general problems in mathematical optimization.

As a first step in solving the problem, a mathematical model is expressed in terms of variables and equations such as the Hock & Schittkowski Benchmark Problem #71 used to test the performance of nonlinear programming solvers. This particular optimization problem has an objective function $\min_{x\in\mathbb R}\; x_1 x_4 (x_1+x_2+x_3)+x_3$ and subject to the inequality constraint $x_1 x_2 x_3 x_4 \ge 25$ and equality constraint ${x_1}^2 + {x_2}^2 + {x_3}^2 + {x_4}^2=40$. The four variables must be between a lower bound of 1 and an upper bound of 5. The initial guess values are $x_1 = 1, x_2=5, x_3=5, x_4=1$. This mathematical model is translated into the APMonitor modeling language in the following text file.

! file saved as hs71.apm
Variables
  x1 = 1, >=1, <=5
  x2 = 5, >=1, <=5
  x3 = 5, >=1, <=5
  x4 = 1, >=1, <=5
End Variables

Equations
  minimize x1*x4*(x1+x2+x3) + x3

  x1*x2*x3*x4 > 25
  x1^2 + x2^2 + x3^2 + x4^2 = 40
End Equations

The problem is then solved in Python by first installing the APMonitor package with pip install APMonitor or from the following Python code.

# Install APMonitor
import pip
pip.main(["install", "APMonitor"])

Installing a Python is only required once for any module. Once the APMonitor package is installed, it is imported and the apm_solve function solves the optimization problem. The solution is returned to the programming language for further processing and analysis.

# Python example for solving an optimization problem
from APMonitor.apm import amp_solve

# Solve optimization problem
sol = apm_solve("hs71", 3)

# Access solution
x1 = sol["x1"]
x2 = sol["x2"]

Similar interfaces are available for MATLAB and Julia with minor differences from the above syntax. Extending the capability of a modeling language is important because significant pre- or post-processing of data or solutions is often required when solving complex optimization, dynamic simulation, estimation, or control problems.

== High index DAEs ==
The highest order of a derivative that is necessary to return a DAE to ODE form is called the differentiation index. A standard way for dealing with high-index DAEs is to differentiate the equations to put them in index-1 DAE or ODE form. However, this approach can cause a number of undesirable numerical issues such as instability. While the syntax is similar to other modeling languages such as gProms, APMonitor solves DAEs of any index without rearrangement or differentiation. As an example, an index-3 DAE is shown below for the pendulum motion equations and lower index rearrangements can return this system of equations to ODE form.

=== Pendulum motion (index-3 DAE form) ===
Model pendulum
  Parameters
    m = 1
    g = 9.81
    s = 1
  End Parameters

  Variables
    x = 0
    y = -s
    v = 1
    w = 0
    lam = m*(1+s*g)/2*s^2
  End Variables

  Equations
    x^2 + y^2 = s^2
    $x = v
    $y = w
    m*$v = -2*x*lam
    m*$w = -m*g - 2*y*lam
  End Equations
End Model

== Applications in APMonitor Modeling Language ==
Many physical systems are naturally expressed by differential algebraic equation. Some of these include:

- cell cultures
- chemical reactors
- cogeneration (power and heat)
- distillation columns
- drilling automation
- essential oil steam distillation
- friction stir welding
- hydrate formation in deep-sea pipelines
- infectious disease spread
- oscillators
- severe slugging control
- solar thermal energy production
- solid oxide fuel cells
- space shuttle launch simulation
- Unmanned Aerial Vehicles (UAVs)

Models for a direct current (DC) motor and blood glucose response of an insulin dependent patient are listed below. They are representative of differential and algebraic equations encountered in many branches of science and engineering.

=== Direct current (DC) motor ===
Parameters
  ! motor parameters (dc motor)
  v   = 36        ! input voltage to the motor (volts)
  rm  = 0.1       ! motor resistance (ohms)
  lm  = 0.01      ! motor inductance (henrys)
  kb  = 6.5e-4    ! back emf constant (volt·s/rad)
  kt  = 0.1       ! torque constant (N·m/a)
  jm  = 1.0e-4    ! rotor inertia (kg m^2)
  bm  = 1.0e-5    ! mechanical damping (linear model of friction: bm * dth)

  ! load parameters
  jl = 1000*jm    ! load inertia (1000 times the rotor)
  bl = 1.0e-3     ! load damping (friction)
  k = 1.0e2       ! spring constant for motor shaft to load
  b = 0.1         ! spring damping for motor shaft to load
End Parameters

Variables
  i     = 0       ! motor electric current (amperes)
  dth_m = 0       ! rotor angular velocity sometimes called omega (radians/sec)
  th_m  = 0       ! rotor angle, theta (radians)
  dth_l = 0       ! wheel angular velocity (rad/s)
  th_l  = 0       ! wheel angle (radians)
End Variables

Equations
  lm*$i - v = -rm*i -    kb *$th_m
  jm*$dth_m =  kt*i - (bm+b)*$th_m - k*th_m +     b *$th_l + k*th_l
  jl*$dth_l =             b *$th_m + k*th_m - (b+bl)*$th_l - k*th_l
  dth_m = $th_m
  dth_l = $th_l
End Equations

=== Blood glucose response of an insulin dependent patient ===
! Model source:
! A. Roy and R.S. Parker. “Dynamic Modeling of Free Fatty 
!   Acids, Glucose, and Insulin: An Extended Minimal Model,”
!   Diabetes Technology and Therapeutics 8(6), 617-626, 2006.
Parameters
  p1 = 0.068       ! 1/min
  p2 = 0.037       ! 1/min
  p3 = 0.000012    ! 1/min
  p4 = 1.3         ! mL/(min·µU)
  p5 = 0.000568    ! 1/mL
  p6 = 0.00006     ! 1/(min·µmol)
  p7 = 0.03        ! 1/min
  p8 = 4.5         ! mL/(min·µU)
  k1 = 0.02        ! 1/min
  k2 = 0.03        ! 1/min
  pF2 = 0.17       ! 1/min
  pF3 = 0.00001    ! 1/min
  n = 0.142        ! 1/min
  VolG = 117       ! dL
  VolF = 11.7      ! L
  ! basal parameters for Type-I diabetic
  Ib = 0           ! Insulin (µU/mL)
  Xb = 0           ! Remote insulin (µU/mL)
  Gb = 98          ! Blood Glucose (mg/dL)
  Yb = 0           ! Insulin for Lipogenesis (µU/mL)
  Fb = 380         ! Plasma Free Fatty Acid (µmol/L)
  Zb = 380         ! Remote Free Fatty Acid (µmol/L)
  ! insulin infusion rate
  u1 = 3           ! µU/min
  ! glucose uptake rate
  u2 = 300         ! mg/min
  ! external lipid infusion
  u3 = 0           ! mg/min
End parameters

Intermediates
  p9 = 0.00021 * exp(-0.0055*G)  ! dL/(min*mg)
End Intermediates

Variables
  I = Ib
  X = Xb
  G = Gb
  Y = Yb
  F = Fb
  Z = Zb
End variables

Equations
  ! Insulin dynamics
  $I = -n*I  + p5*u1
  ! Remote insulin compartment dynamics
  $X = -p2*X + p3*I
  ! Glucose dynamics
  $G = -p1*G - p4*X*G + p6*G*Z + p1*Gb - p6*Gb*Zb + u2/VolG
  ! Insulin dynamics for lipogenesis
  $Y = -pF2*Y + pF3*I
  ! Plasma-free fatty acid (FFA) dynamics
  $F = -p7*(F-Fb) - p8*Y*F + p9 * (F*G-Fb*Gb) + u3/VolF
  ! Remote FFA dynamics
  $Z = -k2*(Z-Zb) + k1*(F-Fb)
End Equations

== See also ==
- APOPT
- ASCEND
- EMSO
- GEKKO
- MATLAB
- Modelica
