= NPSOL =

Mathematical software package

NPSOL is a software package that performs numerical optimization. It solves nonlinear constrained problems using the sequential quadratic programming algorithm. It was written in Fortran by Philip Gill of UCSD and Walter Murray, Michael Saunders and Margaret Wright of Stanford University. The name derives from a combination of NP for nonlinear programming and SOL, the Systems Optimization Laboratory at Stanford.
