= Kalker =

Kalker is a German- and Dutch-language occupational surname for a lime burner (cf. Chalker, Kolker, Kalkbrenner). It may refer to:

- Dennis Kalker (fl. 2001–2006), Dutch speed skater, 2002 winner of the KNSB Dutch Super Sprint Championships
- Joost Jacques Kalker (1933–2006), Dutch mechanical engineer
- Martha Vonk-van Kalker (1943–2022), Dutch politician
