= Kolker =

Kolker is either a German-language occupational surname for a lime burner (cf. Kalker, Kalkbrenner), a Jewish habitational name for someone from Kolky in Ukraine, of a German or Dutch topographic surname, derived from kolk. Notable people with the surname include:

- Alexander Kolker (1933–2023), Soviet and Russian composer
- Ava Kolker (2006), American child actress
- Boris Kolker (1939), Russian esperantist
- Chris Kolker, American politician from Colorado
- Henry Kolker (1874–1947), American actor and director
- Jimmy J. Kolker (1948), American diplomat
- Robert Kolker, American journalist
- Robert P. Kolker, American film historian, theorist, and critic
- Sabrina Kolker (1980), Canadian rower
- Yuri Kolker (1946), Russian poet

== See also ==
- Kolker (Saga of Seven Suns), fictional character created by Kevin J Anderson
- Kolk
