= Selišče, Zagorje ob Savi =

Selišče
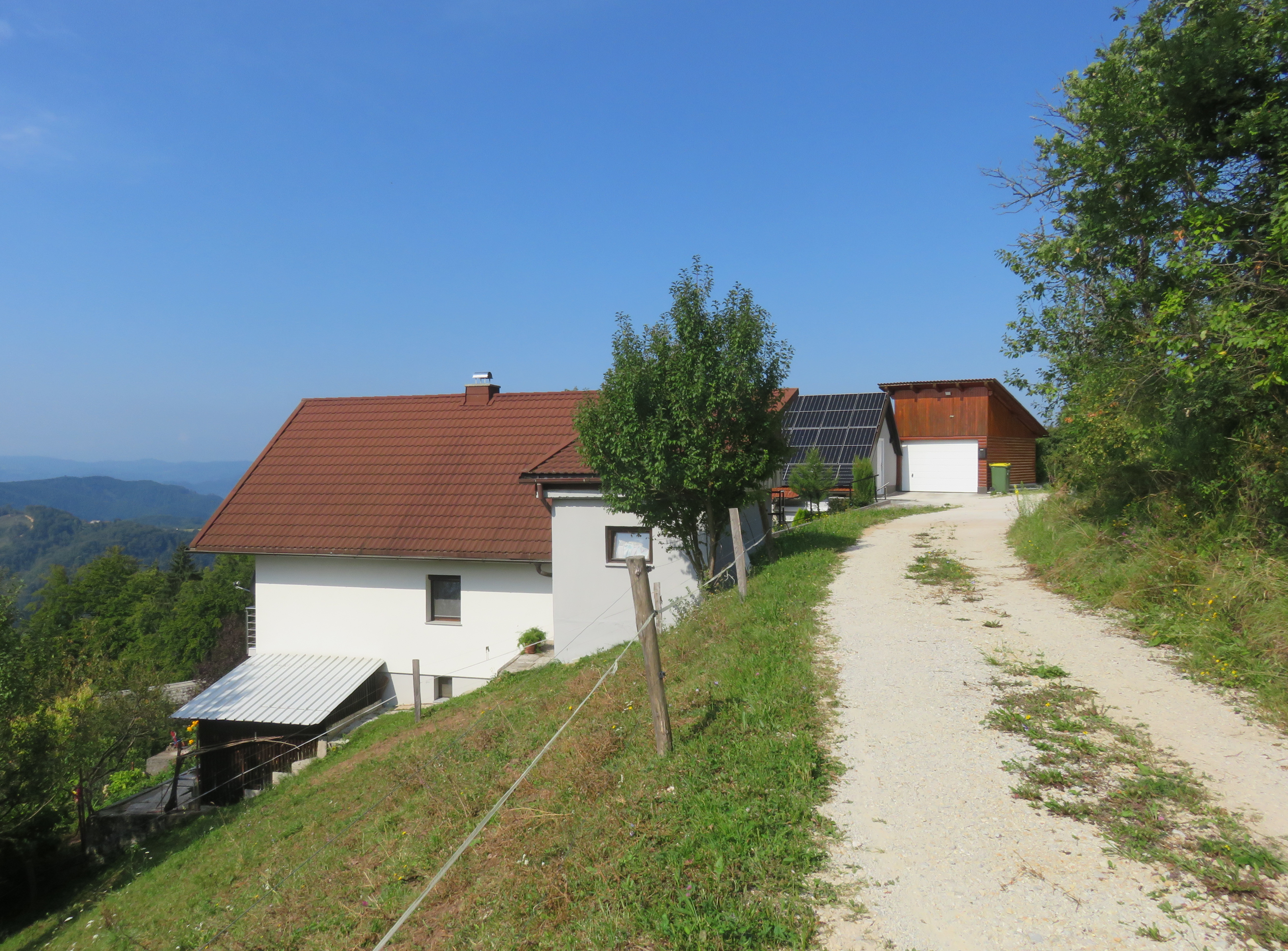

- Location in Slovenia
- Coordinates: 46°5′53″N 14°56′15″E
- Country: Slovenia
- Traditional region: Upper Carniola
- Statistical region: Central Sava
- Municipality: Zagorje ob Savi
- Elevation: 640 m (2,100 ft)

Selišče (pronounced [sɛˈliːʃtʃɛ]) is a former village in central Slovenia in the Municipality of Zagorje ob Savi. It is now part of the village of Kolk. It is part of the traditional region of Upper Carniola and is now included in the Central Sava Statistical Region.

== Geography ==
Selišče stands southeast of the village center of Kolk, above the Sava Valley. It is connected by a side road to Krivica and Jarše, both to the north.

== Name ==
The name Selišče comes from the diminutive common noun selišče 'place to live; hamlet, settlement', derived from selo 'village'. It is thus related to toponyms such as Selo, Sela, Selnica, and Sevnica.

== History ==
Selišče had a population of six (in two houses) in 1890 and in 1900. Selišče was annexed by Kolk in 1953, ending its existence as a separate settlement.
