= Zavšenik =

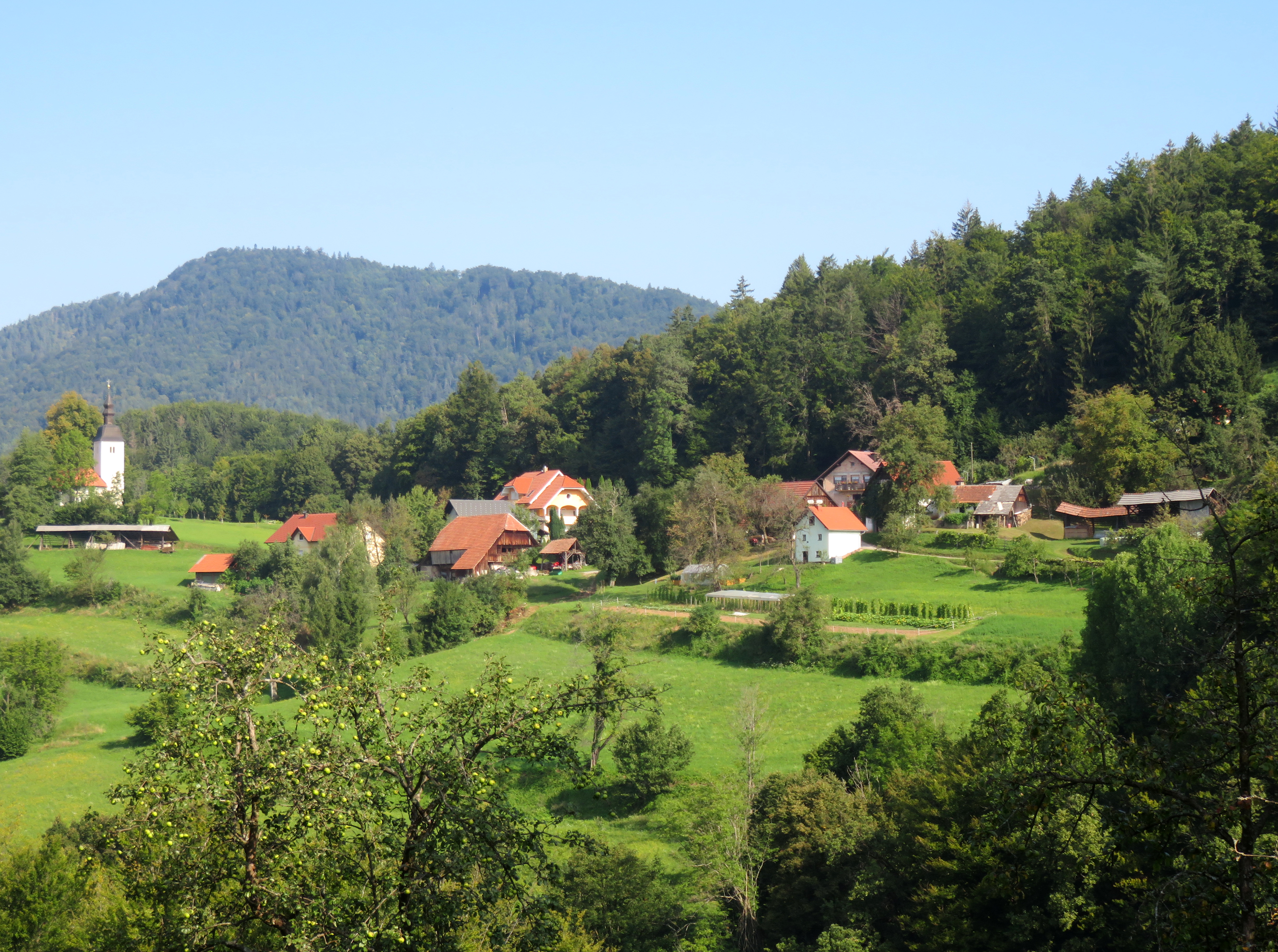

- Location in Slovenia
- Coordinates: 46°6′18″N 14°55′35″E
- Country: Slovenia
- Traditional region: Upper Carniola
- Statistical region: Central Sava
- Municipality: Zagorje ob Savi
- Elevation: 563 m (1,847 ft)

Zavšenik (pronounced [zau̯ʃɛˈniːk], in older sources Savšenik, German: Schauschenik or Sawschenik) is a former village in central Slovenia in the Municipality of Zagorje ob Savi. It is now part of the village of Kolk. It is part of the traditional region of Upper Carniola and is now included in the Central Sava Statistical Region.

== Geography ==
Zavšenik stands north of the village center of Kolk, on the edge of the Šentlambert Plateau above the Mošenik Gorge. It is connected by a road to Senožeti to the north and Kolk to the south.

== History ==
Zavšenik had a population 32 in five houses in 1880, 32 in seven houses in 1890, and 25 in four houses in 1931. Zavšenik was annexed by Kolk in 1953, ending its existence as a separate settlement.
