= Krivica, Zagorje ob Savi =

Krivica
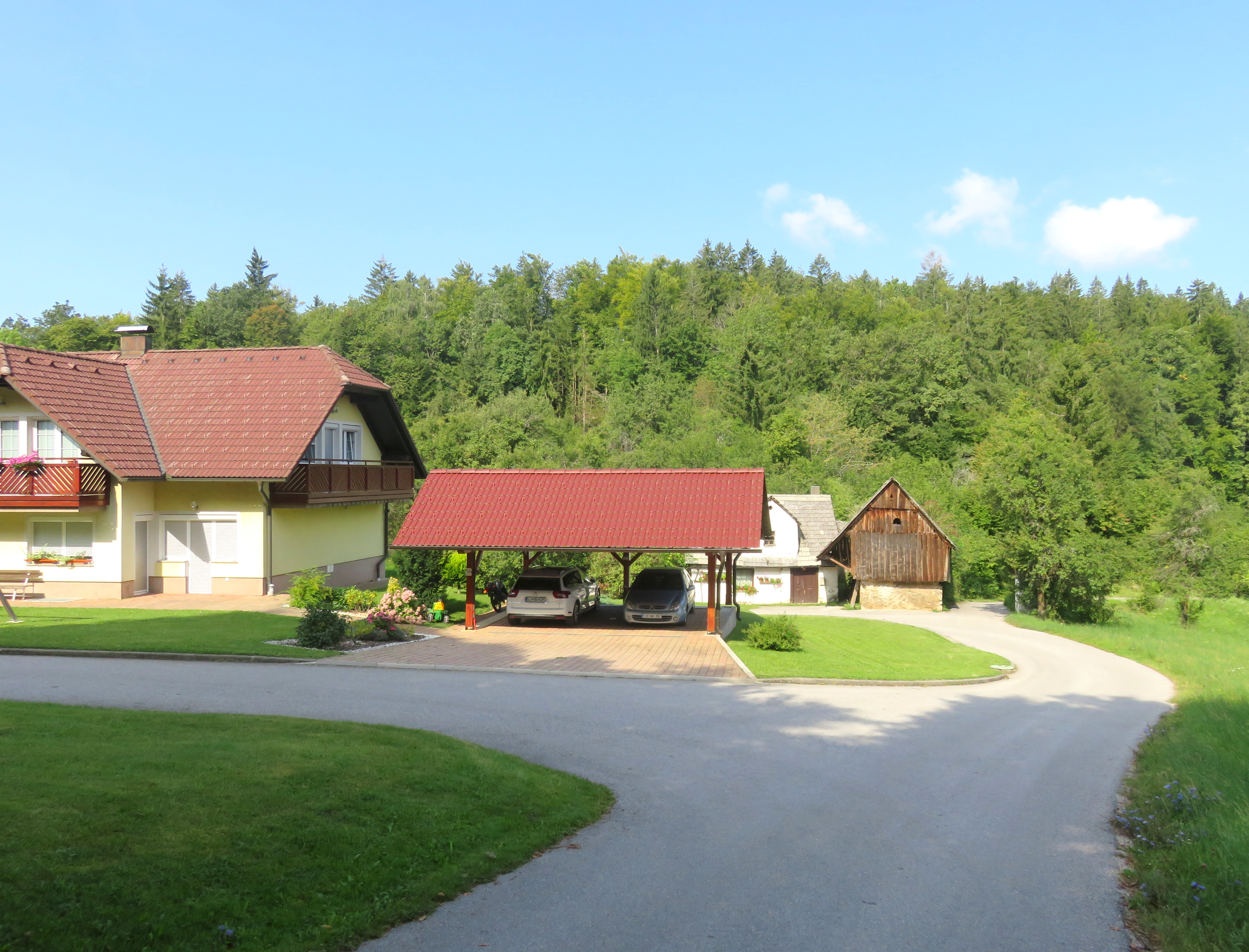

- Location in Slovenia
- Coordinates: 46°6′16″N 14°56′02″E
- Country: Slovenia
- Traditional region: Upper Carniola
- Statistical region: Central Sava
- Municipality: Zagorje ob Savi
- Elevation: 606 m (1,988 ft)

Krivica (pronounced [kɾiˈʋiːtsa]) is a former village in central Slovenia in the Municipality of Zagorje ob Savi. It is now part of the village of Kolk. It is part of the traditional region of Upper Carniola and is now included in the Central Sava Statistical Region.

== Geography ==
Krivica stands northeast of the village center of Kolk. It is connected by a side road to Senožeti to the northwest and Jarše to the east.

== Name ==
Krivica was attested as Krieh in written sources in 1444 and 1465.

== History ==
Krivica had a population of 15 (in three houses) in 1880. Krivica was annexed by Kolk in 1953, ending its existence as a separate settlement.
