= Van der Kolk =

Van der Kolk is a Dutch toponymic surname, meaning "from/of a kolk". The surname Van der Wiel has a similar origin. It could also have referred to a specific settlement or water named De Kolk. People with the surname include:

- Bessel van der Kolk (born 1943), Dutch psychiatrist
- Henk Van der Kolk, Canadian film producer
- Jacobus Schroeder van der Kolk (1797–1862), Dutch physician
- Kirsten van der Kolk (born 1975), Dutch rower
- Marie José van der Kolk (born 1974), Dutch singer known as Loona
- Nick van der Kolk, American podcaster and actor
- Niels van der Kolk (born 1970), Dutch water-polo player

== See also ==
- Kolk (disambiguation)
