= Chalker =

Chalker is a surname. Notable people with the surname include:

- Curly Chalker (1931–1998), American musician
- Dennis Chalker (born 1954), United States Navy sailor, inventor and writer
- Jack Bridger Chalker (born 1918), English artist
- Jack L. Chalker (1944–2005), American writer
- James Chalker (1912–2003), Canadian politician and businessman
- Lloyd Chalker (1883–1981), United States Coast Guard officer
- Lynda Chalker, Baroness Chalker of Wallasey (born 1942), British politician
- Rebecca Chalker (born 1943), American health writer and women's rights activist
- Will Chalker (born 1980), English model
