= Kolk =

Kolk may refer to:

== People ==
- Douglas Kolk (1963–2014), American artist
- Hanco Kolk (born 1957), Dutch cartoonist
- Lembit Kolk (1907–2003), Estonian politician
- Raimond Kolk (1924–1992), Estonian writer and critic
- Santi Kolk (born 1981), Dutch footballer
- Scott Kolk (1905–1993), American actor
- Oets Kolk Bouwsma (1898–1978), American philosopher

== Other ==
- KOLK, a radio station licensed to Lakeside, Montana, United States
- Kolk (bog), a waterbody in the middle of a raised or kettle bog
- Kolk (vortex), a powerful underwater vortex
- Kolk, Zagorje ob Savi, a settlement in Upper Carniola, Slovenia
- Kolk (Heidmark), a village destroyed to make the Bergen-Hohne Training Area in Lower Saxony, Germany
- Kolk-Spandau, a subdivision of Spandau in Spandau Borough, Berlin, Germany

== See also ==
- Van der Kolk, a surname (including a list of people with the name)
