= Nikolai Pavlovich Petrov =

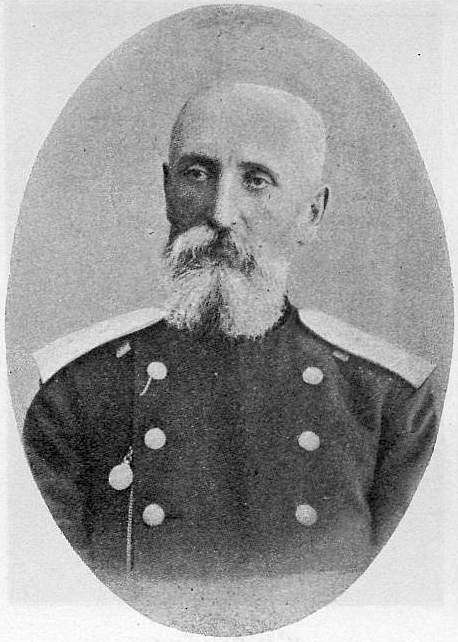

Nikolai Pavlovich Petrov (13 May 1836 – 15 January 1920) was a Russian army professor of mechanics and engineering who is considered one of the founders of tribology or the study of friction and lubrication. He is best known for what is known as Petrov's Law of friction.

Petrov was born in an aristocratic family in Novgorod. He was educated at the Constantine Artillery Academy and the Nicholas Engineering Academy then became an instructor in mathematics. He studied mechanics under M. V. Ostrogradsky and then joined as a professor of applied mechanics at the Nicholas Engineering Academy in 1867. His main work was on the examination of railway vehicles, examining steam engines, and his main work was on the lubrication of bearings for the wheels. He examined journal bearings used in the axles of the wheels of railway coaches and identified a relationship on friction in rotating components, the viscosity of lubricants and frictional torque which goes by the name of Petrov's Law (or Petroff's Law).
