= Senožeti, Zagorje ob Savi =

Senožeti
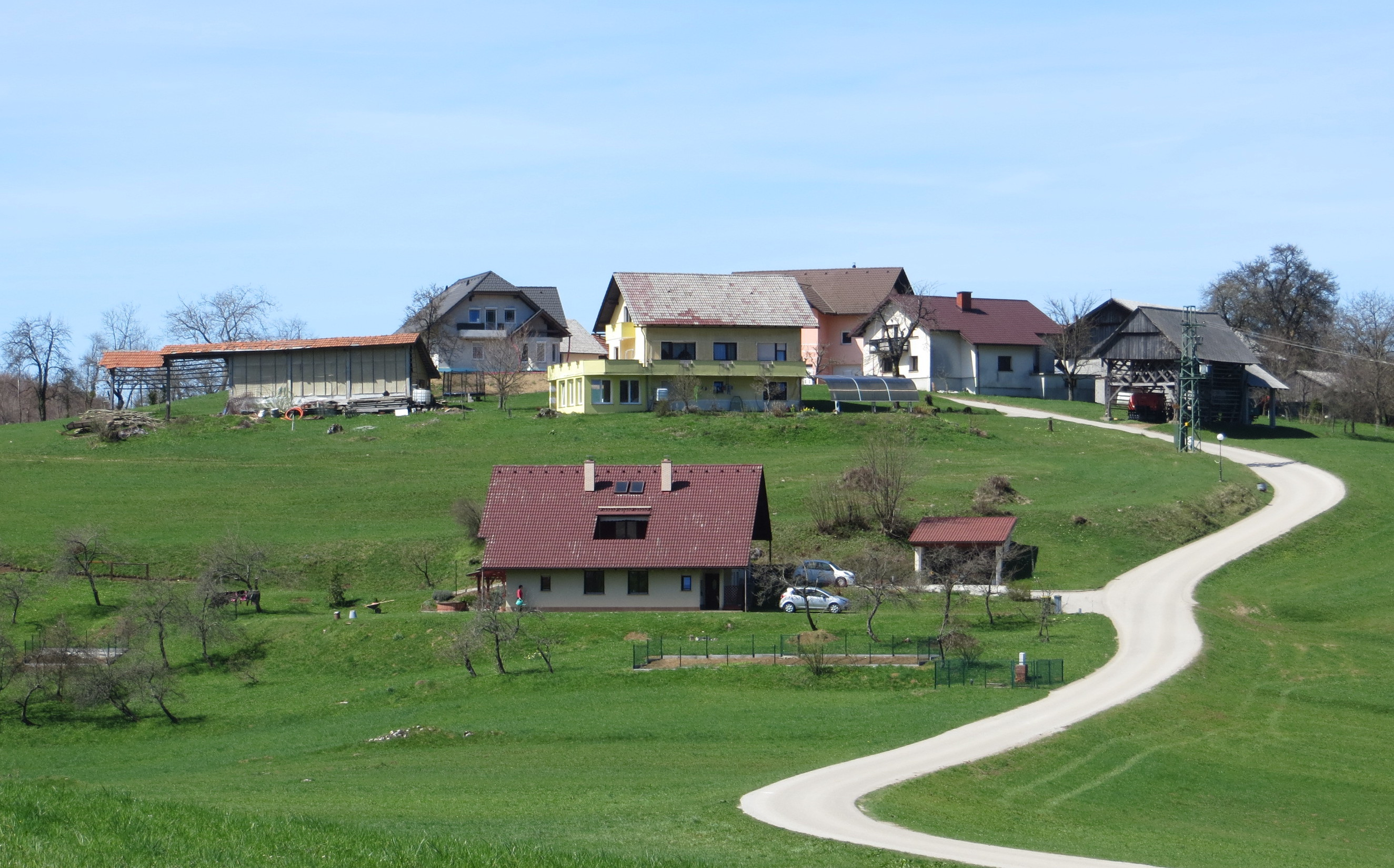

- Location in Slovenia
- Coordinates: 46°6′39.62″N 14°55′38.72″E
- Country: Slovenia
- Traditional region: Upper Carniola
- Statistical region: Central Sava
- Municipality: Zagorje ob Savi

Area
  - Total: 0.79 km^{2} (0.31 sq mi)
- Elevation: 584.6 m (1,918 ft)

Population (2002)
  - Total: 21
- Postal code: 1410

Senožeti (pronounced [sɛnɔˈʒeːti]) is a settlement west of Šentlambert in the Municipality of Zagorje ob Savi in central Slovenia. The area is part of the traditional region of Upper Carniola. It is now included with the rest of the municipality in the Central Sava Statistical Region.

== Church ==
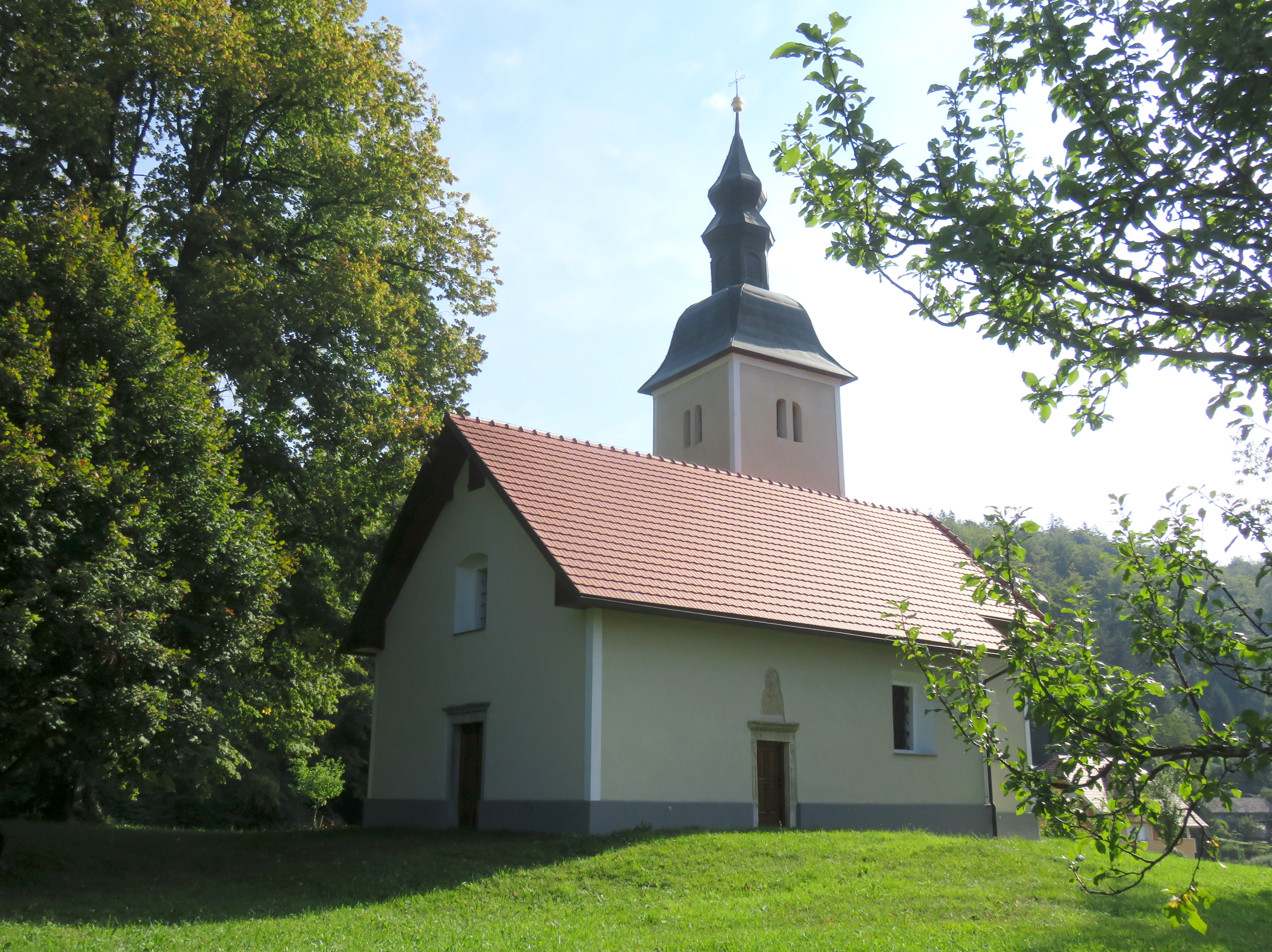
Holy Spirit Church

The local church, built south of the settlement core, is dedicated to the Holy Spirit (Slovene: Sveti Duh) and belongs to the Parish of Šentlambert. It dates to the late 17th century.
