= Jarše, Zagorje ob Savi =

Jarše
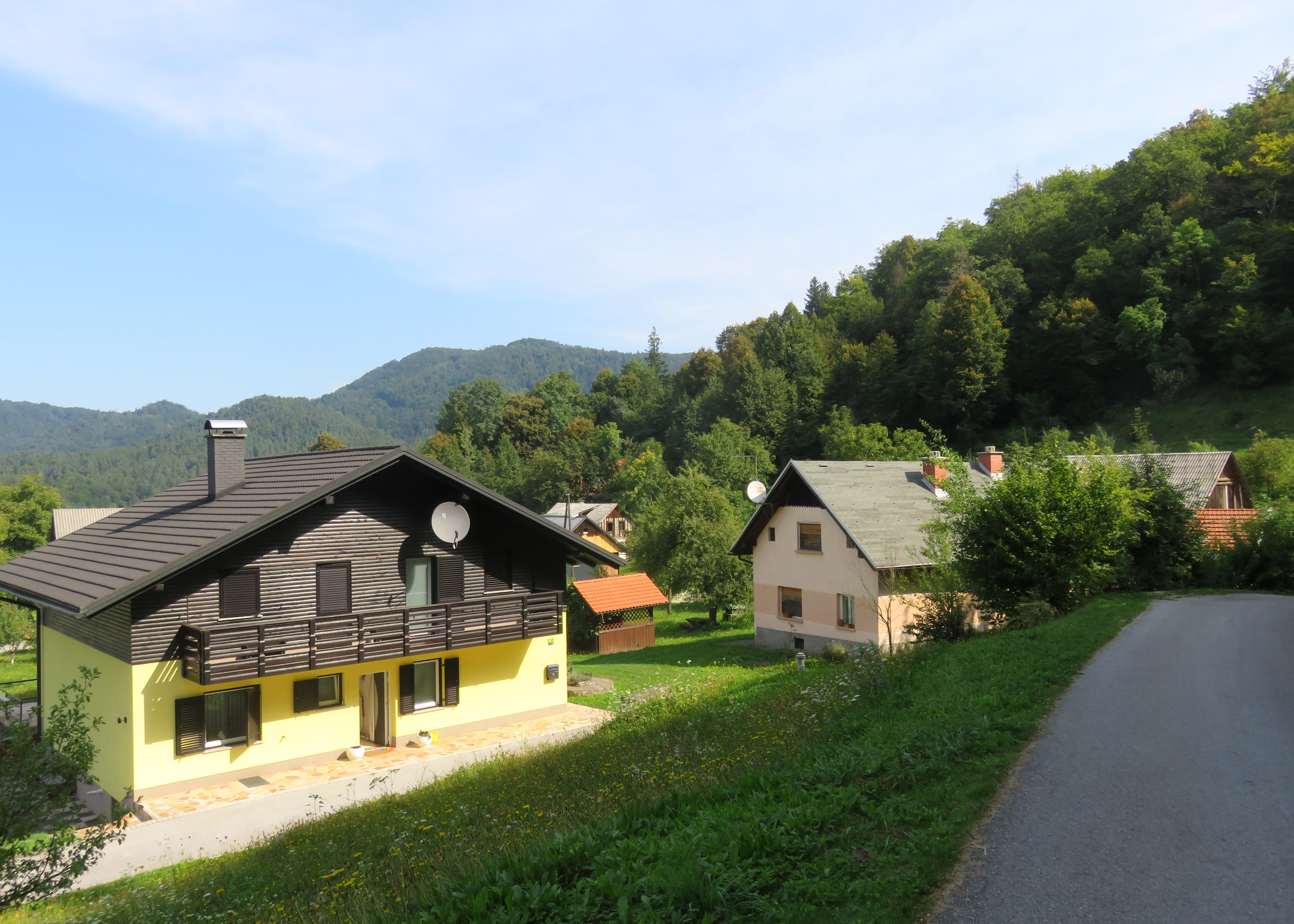

- Location in Slovenia
- Coordinates: 46°6′25.71″N 14°56′16.46″E
- Country: Slovenia
- Traditional region: Upper Carniola
- Statistical region: Central Sava
- Municipality: Zagorje ob Savi

Area
  - Total: 0.3 km^{2} (0.12 sq mi)
- Elevation: 612 m (2,008 ft)

Population (2002)
  - Total: 16
- Postal code: 1410

Jarše (Slovene pronunciation: [ˈjàːɾʃɛ]) is a small settlement south of Šentlambert in the Municipality of Zagorje ob Savi in central Slovenia. The area is part of the traditional region of Upper Carniola. It is now included with the rest of the municipality in the Central Sava Statistical Region.
