= Will Chalker =

British model

- Born: 7 March 1980 (age 45); East Sussex, England
- Occupation: Model
- Years active: 2000–present
- Spouse: Chloe Pridham (2 August 2014)
- Modelling information
- Height: 185 cm (6 ft 1 in)
- Hair colour: Blonde
- Eye colour: Green
- Agency: IMG Models (New York); Marilyn Agency (Paris); FASHION MODEL MANAGEMENT (Milan); Select Model Management (London); Traffic Models (Barcelona); UNIQUE DENMARK (Copenhagen); LA Model Management (Los Angeles); Stockholmsgruppen (Stockholm)

Will Chalker (born 7 March 1980) is an English model and an amateur boxer. He is ranked 11th on Models.com's Money Guys list.

== Life and career ==
Chalker was born in East Sussex. He began modelling at the age of twenty in 2000, leaving his earlier career as a construction worker after a friend took test shots of him.

His big break happened when he was featured in the advertising campaign of Paco Rabanne's perfume Black XS in 2003.

Since then, he has appeared in major ad campaigns including J.Crew, YSL, Perry Ellis, Wormland, Valentino, Mark O'Polo, Zara, Bottega Veneta, Louis Vuitton, Shiatzy Chen, Dsquared2, Gap, Ermenegildo Zegna and Paul Smith. His runway tasks include opening and closing for Gucci, John Galliano's finishing tableau, Athena-poster look for D&G, carrying a baby tiger onto Dolce & Gabbana's spring/summer 2005 menswear catwalk, and walking along Sonia Rykiel during her show. He has appeared in GQ, l'Uomo Vogue, i-D, Japanese Wallpaper, Spanish Esquire and Upstreet. He has also done commercials for Levi's and his commercial for Paco Rabanne Black XS with has been remixed with scenes starring Bianca Balti to promote its "for her" version.

He has been the first man nominated for Best Model at the British Fashion Awards.

He is currently signed with New York Model Management in New York City, L.A. Models in Los Angeles, Models 1 in London, Mega Model Agency in Hamburg, Unique Models in Copenhagen and Fashion Models in Milan.
