= Directional stability =

Tendency

Directional stability is the tendency of a vehicle or moving body to keep its orientation aligned with its direction of movement. When a car or an airplane gets turned a little relative to its direction of motion, it might correct itself, over-correct itself, or it might start to spin out of control. If it tends to correct itself, we say it is directionally stable, while if it tends to spin out, we say it is directionally unstable. There are many factors that can affect dynamic stability, including speed, weather and road conditions, vehicle shape and mass distribution, and tire properties.

Vehicle oscillations associated with dynamic stability are frequently called "weather vaning". When the vehicle's orientation is perturbed from the direction of motion, a restoring moment may be produced which is in a direction opposite to the orientation disturbance. This can lead to oscillations in orientation around the center of mass similar to a weather vane rotating about its (vertical) pivot.

With the exception of spacecraft, vehicles generally have a recognisable front and rear and are designed so that the front points more or less in the direction of motion. Without this stability, they may tumble end over end, spin or orient themselves at a high angle of attack, even broadside on to the direction of motion. At high angles of attack, drag forces may become excessive, the vehicle may be impossible to control, or may even experience structural failure. In general, land, sea, air and underwater vehicles are designed to have a natural tendency to point in the direction of motion.

== Example: road vehicle ==
Arrows, darts, rockets, and airships have tail surfaces (fins or feathers) to achieve directional stability; an airplane uses its vertical stabilizer for the same purpose. A road vehicle does not have elements specifically designed to maintain stability, but relies primarily on the distribution of mass.

=== Introduction ===
These points are best illustrated with an example. The first stage of studying the stability of a road vehicle is the derivation of a reasonable approximation to the equations of motion.

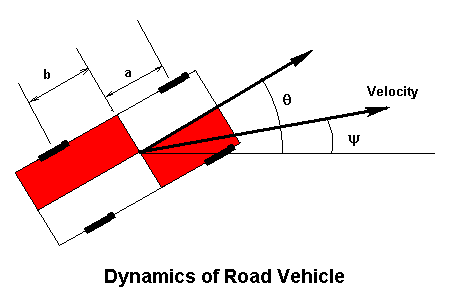

The diagram illustrates a four-wheel vehicle, in which the front axle is located a distance $a$ ahead of the centre of gravity and the rear axle is a distance $b$ aft of the cg. The body of the car is pointing in a direction $\theta$ (theta) whilst it is travelling in a direction $\psi$ (psi). In general, these are not the same. The tyre treads at the region of contact point in the direction of travel, but the hubs are aligned with the vehicle body, with the steering held central. The tyres distort as they rotate to accommodate this mis-alignment, and generate side forces as a consequence.

The net side force Y on the vehicle is the centripetal force causing the vehicle to change the direction it is traveling:

$$MV \frac {d\psi} {dt} = Y \,\cos(\theta-\psi)$$

where M is the vehicle mass and V the speed. The angles are all assumed small, so the lateral force equation is:

$$MV\frac{d\psi}{dt}=Y$$

The rotation of the body subjected to a yawing moment N is governed by:

$$I\frac{d^2\theta}{dt^2}=N$$

where I is the moment of inertia in yaw. The forces and moments of interest arise from the distortion of the tyres. The angle between the direction the tread is rolling and the hub is called the slip angle. This is a bit of a misnomer, because the tyre as a whole does not actually slip, part of the region in contact with the road adheres, and part of the region slips. We assume that the tyre force is directly proportional to the slip angle ($\phi$). This is made up of the slip of the vehicle as a whole modified by the angular velocity of the body. For the front axle:

$$\phi(front)=\theta-\psi-\frac{a}{V}\frac{d\theta}{dt}$$

whilst for the rear axle:

$$\phi(rear)=\theta-\psi+\frac{b}{V}\frac{d\theta}{dt}$$

Let the constant of proportionality be k. The sideforce is, therefore:

$$Y=2k(\phi(front)+\phi(rear))=4k(\theta-\psi)+2k\frac{(b-a)}{V}\frac{d\theta}{dt}$$

The moment is:

$$N=2k(a\phi(front)-b\phi(rear))=2k(a-b)(\theta-\psi)-2k\frac{(a^2+b^2)}{V}\frac{d\theta}{dt}$$

Denoting the angular velocity $\omega$, the equations of motion are:

$$\frac{d\omega}{dt}=2k\frac{(a-b)}{I}(\theta-\psi)-2k\frac{(a^2+b^2)}{VI}\omega$$
$$\frac{d\theta}{dt}=\omega$$
$$\frac{d\psi}{dt}=\frac{4k}{MV}(\theta-\psi)+2k\frac{(b-a)}{MV^2}\omega$$

Let $\theta-\psi=\beta$ (beta), the slip angle for the vehicle as a whole:

$$\frac{d\omega}{dt}=2k\frac{(a-b)}{I}\beta-2k\frac{(a^2+b^2)}{VI}\omega$$
$$\frac{d\beta}{dt}=-\frac{4k}{MV}\beta+(1-2k\frac{(b-a)}{MV^2})\omega$$

Eliminating $\omega$ yields the following equation in $\beta$:

$$\frac{d^2\beta}{dt^2}+(\frac{4k}{MV}+\frac{2k(a^2+b^2)}{VI})\frac{d\beta}{dt}+(\frac{4k^2(a+b)^2}{MV^2I}+\frac{2k(b-a)}{I})\beta=0$$

This is called a second-order linear homogeneous equation, and its properties form the basis of much of control theory.

=== Stability analysis ===
We do not need to solve the equation of motion explicitly to decide whether the solution diverges indefinitely or converges to zero following an initial perturbation. The form of the solution depends on the signs of the coefficients.

The coefficient of $\frac{d\beta}{dt}$ will be called the 'damping' by analogy with a mass-spring-damper which has a similar equation of motion.

By the same analogy, the coefficient of $\beta$ will be called the 'stiffness', as its function is to return the system to zero deflection, in the same manner as a spring.

The form of the solution depends only on the signs of the damping and stiffness terms. The four possible solution types are presented in the figure.

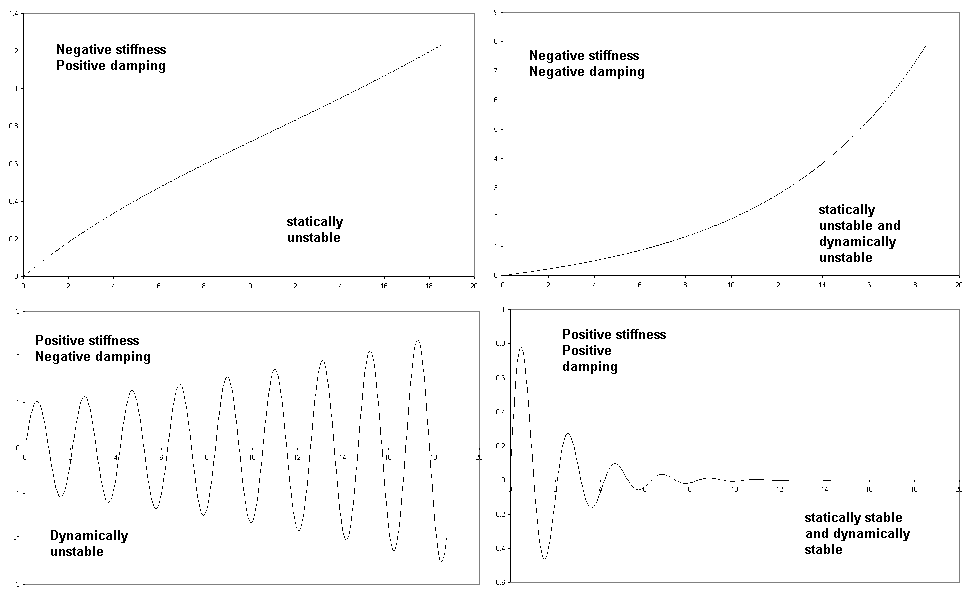

The only satisfactory solution requires both stiffness and damping to be positive.

The damping term is:

$$(\frac{4k}{MV}+\frac{2k(a^2+b^2)}{VI})$$

The tyre slip coefficient k is positive, as are the mass, moment of inertia and speed, so the damping is positive, and the directional motion should be dynamically stable.

The stiffness term is:

$$(\frac{4k^2(a+b)^2}{MIV^2}+\frac{2k(b-a)}{I})$$

If the centre of gravity is ahead of the centre of the wheelbase ($(b>a)$, this will always be positive, and the vehicle will be stable at all speeds. However, if it lies further aft, the term has the potential of becoming negative above a speed given by:

$$V^2=\frac{2k(a+b)^2}{M(a-b)}$$

Above this speed, the vehicle will be directionally unstable.

=== Relative effect of front and rear tyres ===
If for some reason (incorrect inflation pressure, worn tread) the tyres on one axle are incapable of generating significant lateral force, the stability will obviously be affected.

Assume to begin with that the rear tyres are faulty, what is the effect on stability? If the rear tyres produce no significant forces, the side force and yawing moment become:

$$Y=2k(\phi(front))=2k(\theta-\psi)-2k\frac{a}{V}\frac{d\theta}{dt}$$
$$N=2k(a\phi(front))=2ka(\theta-\psi)-2k\frac{a^2}{V}\frac{d\theta}{dt}$$

The equation of motion becomes:

$$\frac{d^2\beta}{dt^2}+(\frac{2k}{MV}+\frac{2ka^2}{VI})\frac{d\beta}{dt}-(\frac{2ka}{I})\beta=0$$

The coefficient of $\beta$ is negative, so the vehicle will be unstable.

Now consider the effect of faulty tyres at the front. The Side force and yawing moment become:

$$Y=2k(\phi(rear))=2k(\theta-\psi)+2k\frac{b}{V}\frac{d\theta}{dt}$$
$$N=-2k(b\phi(rear))=-2kb(\theta-\psi)-2k\frac{b^2}{V}\frac{d\theta}{dt}$$

The equation of motion becomes:

$$\frac{d^2\beta}{dt^2}+(\frac{2k}{MV}+\frac{2kb^2}{VI})\frac{d\beta}{dt}+(\frac{2kb}{I})\beta=0$$

The coefficient of $\beta$ is positive, so the vehicle will be stable but unsteerable.

It follows that the condition of the rear tyres is more critical to directional stability than the state of the front tyres. Also, locking the rear wheels by applying the handbrake, renders the vehicle directionally unstable, causing it to spin. Since the vehicle is not under control during the spin, the 'handbrake turn' is usually illegal on public roads.

=== Steering forces ===
Deflecting the steering changes the slip angle of the front tyres, generating a sideforce. With conventional steering, the tyres are deflected by different amounts, but for the purposes of this analysis, the additional slip will be considered equal for both front tyres.

The side force becomes:

$$Y=2k(\phi(front)+\phi(rear))=4k(\theta-\psi)+2k\frac{(b-a)}{V}\frac{d\theta}{dt}+2k\eta$$

where $\eta$ (eta) is the steering deflection. Similarly, the yawing moment becomes:

$$N=2k(a\phi(front)-b\phi(rear))=2k(a-b)(\theta-\psi)-2k\frac{(a^2+b^2)}{V}\frac{d\theta}{dt}+2ka\eta$$

Including the steering term introduces a forced response:

$$\frac{d^2\beta}{dt^2}+(\frac{4k}{MV}+\frac{2k(a^2+b^2)}{VI})\frac{d\beta}{dt}+(\frac{4k^2(a+b)^2}{MV^2I}+\frac{2k(b-a)}{I})\beta=-\frac{2k}{MV}\frac{d\eta}{dt}+(\frac{2ka}{I}-\frac{4k^2 b(a+b)}{IMV^2})\eta$$

The steady state response is with all time derivatives set to zero. Stability requires that the coefficient of $\beta$ must be positive, so the sign of the response is determined by the coefficient of $\eta$:

$$(\frac{2ka}{I}-\frac{4k^2 b(a+b)}{IMV^2})$$

This is a function of speed. When the speed is low, the slip is negative and the body points out of the corner (it understeers). At a speed given by:

$$V^2=\frac{2kb(a+b)}{Ma}$$

The body points in the direction of motion. Above this speed, the body points into the corner (oversteers).

As an example:

with k=10kN/radian, M=1000kg, b=1.0m, a=1.0m, the vehicle understeers below 11.3mph.

Evidently moving the centre of gravity forwards increases this speed, giving the vehicle a tendency to understeer.

Note: Installing a heavy, powerful engine in a lightweight production vehicle designed around a small engine increases both its directional stability, and its tendency to understeer. The result is an overpowered vehicle with poor cornering performance.

Even worse is the installation of an oversized power unit into a rear-engined production vehicle without corresponding modification of suspension or mass distribution, as the result will be directionally unstable at high speed.

=== Limitations of the analysis ===
The forces arising from slip depend on the loading on the tyre as well as the slip angle; this effect has been ignored, but could be taken into account by assuming different values of k for the front and rear axles. Roll motion due to cornering will redistribute the tyre loads between the nearside and offside of the vehicle, again modifying the tyre forces. Engine torque likewise redistributes the load between front and rear tyres.

A full analysis should also take into account the suspension response.

The complete analysis is essential for the design of high-performance road vehicles, but is beyond the scope of this article.

== Aviation ==
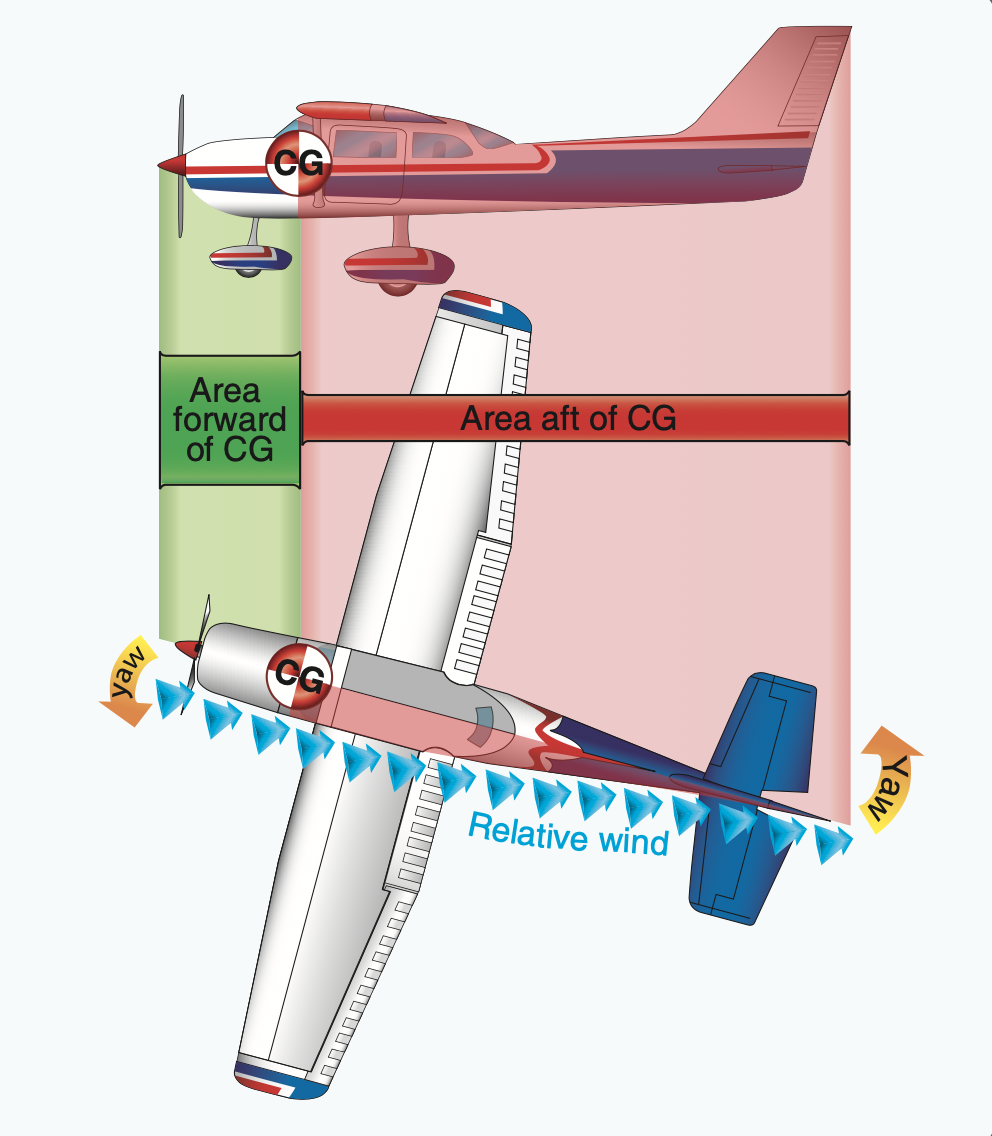
Fuselage behind the center of gravity (CG) and tail fin both contribute to directional stability.

Directional stability about the aircraft's vertical axis is also referred to as yawing. This is primarily achieved by the area of the vertical stabilizer and the sides of the fuselage aft of the center of gravity. When an airplane is flying in a straight line while hit by a side gust of wind, the left/right yawing motion will be stopped by the air striking at the right/left side of the vertical stabilizer.

== See also ==
- Relaxed stability
- Car handling
- Flight dynamics
- Dutch roll
- Longitudinal stability
- Hunting oscillation
