= Kolk, Zagorje ob Savi =

Kolk
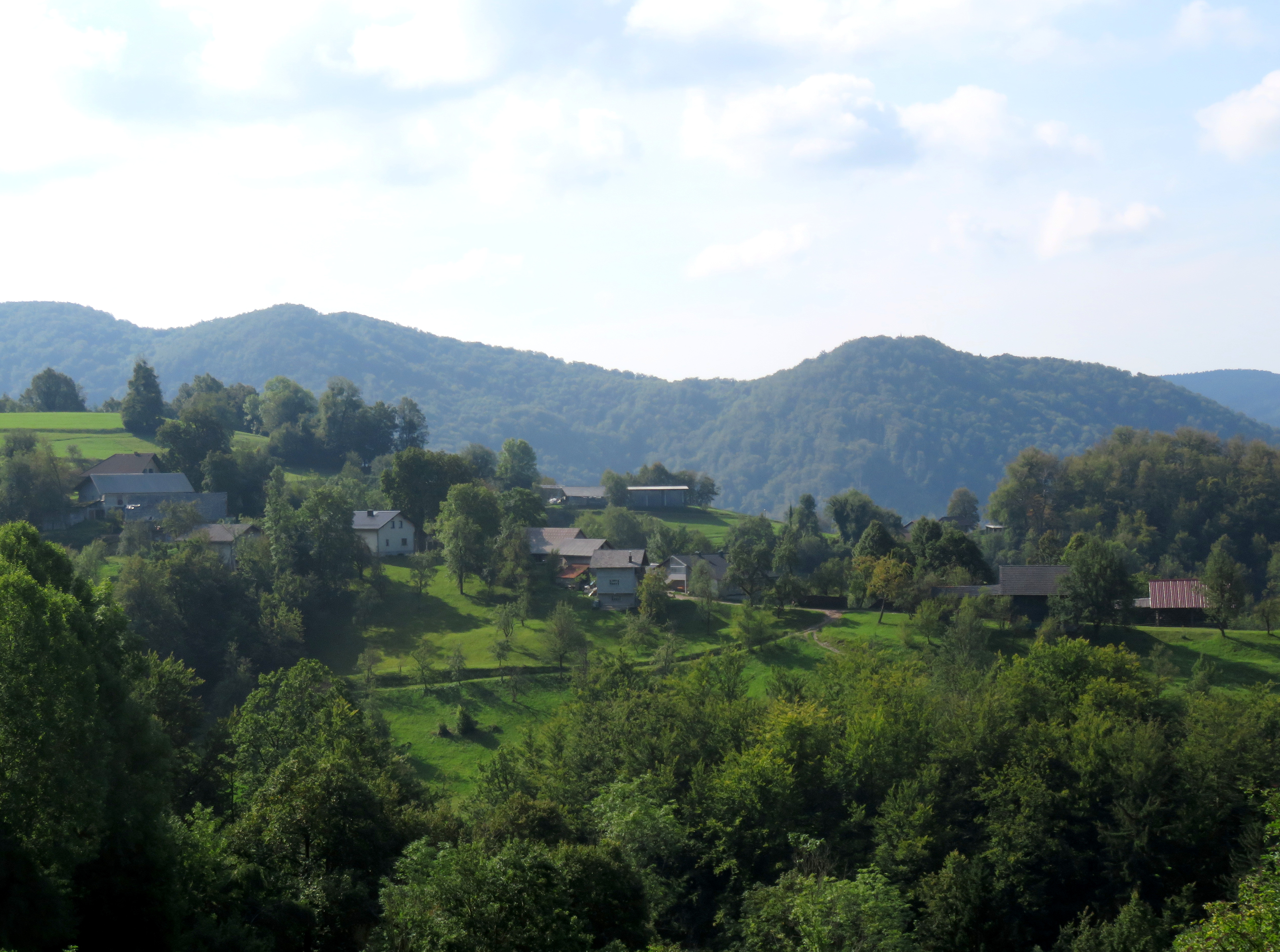

- Location in Slovenia
- Coordinates: 46°6′3.35″N 14°55′46.69″E
- Country: Slovenia
- Traditional region: Upper Carniola
- Statistical region: Central Sava
- Municipality: Zagorje ob Savi

Area
  - Total: 1.14 km^{2} (0.44 sq mi)
- Elevation: 548.6 m (1,800 ft)

Population (2002)
  - Total: 37
- Postal code: 1410

Kolk (pronounced [ˈkoːu̯k] or [ˈkoːlk]) is a small settlement in the hills above the left bank of the Sava River, south of Šentlambert, in the Municipality of Zagorje ob Savi in central Slovenia. The area is part of the traditional region of Upper Carniola. It is now included with the rest of the municipality in the Central Sava Statistical Region. It includes the hamlets of Zavšenik (in older sources also Savšenik) Krivica and Selišče.
