= Kalkbrenner =

Kalkbrenner (German: occupational name for a lime burner) is a German surname. Notable people with the surname include:

- Christian Kalkbrenner (1755–1806), German bandmaster
- Friedrich Kalkbrenner (1785–1849), German pianist
- Fritz Kalkbrenner (born 1981), German musician
- Paul Kalkbrenner (born 1977), German musician
- Ryan Kalkbrenner (born 2002), American basketball player
