= Joost Jacques Kalker =

Dutch engineer (1933–2006)

J.J. Kalker
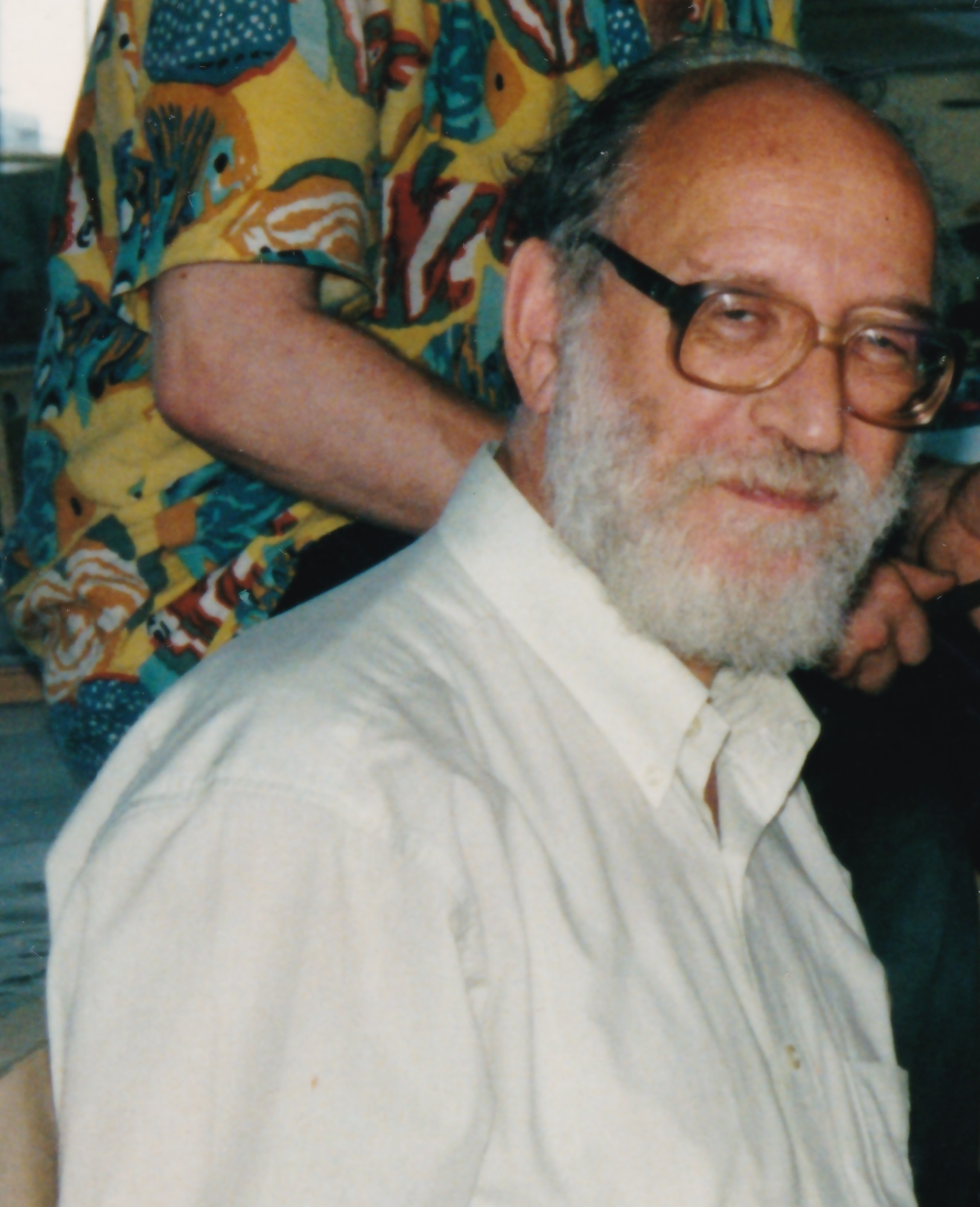
- Joost J. Kalker
- Born: July 25, 1933; The Hague
- Died: April 24, 2006 (aged 72)
- Education: Delft University of Technology
- Scientific career
- Fields: Contact mechanics; Frictional contact mechanics
- Workplaces: Delft University of Technology
- Website: ta.twi.tudelft.nl/wagm/Kalker

Joost Jacques Kalker (25 July 1933 The Hague – 24 April 2006) was a Dutch professor at Delft University of Technology, recognized for his contributions to the field of Contact mechanics. Particularly, in the case of railway systems, his results are used for solving wheel-rail contact problems and railway dynamics. The linear elastic coefficients defined in his theory are known as the Kalker Coefficients.

== Biography ==
Joost J. Kalker was born in a Jewish family to doctor Joseph Emanuel Kalker and Julie Prins Joost J. Kalker and his family were persecuted during the German occupation of The Netherlands in World War II, with his father being murdered in Auschwitz in 1943. His mother survived the Holocaust.

== Professional work ==
His PhD dissertation of 1967 was entitled: “On the rolling contact of two elastic bodies in the presence of dry friction”. In his thesis, Kalker proposed the mechanics behind frictional rolling with arbitrary lateral and longitudinal creep and spin. His basic assumption was to divide the contact patch between the two elastic bodies into two areas: adhesion area and sliding area. His theory made possible to calculate both creep forces and spin moment for rolling contact problems. His theory was first confirmed via experimental tests of creep forces conducted in England and Germany. In 1979, Kalker was appointed full professor at Delft University of Technology in applied mathematics. Kalker created two software with his theory: CONTACT and FASTSIM. He was member of the editorial board of the Journal Vehicle System Dynamics. Joost J. Kalker was advisor of six PhD researches: Max Viergever (1980), Francois van Geer (1987), Juergen Jaeger (1992), Gerard Braat (1993), Frédéric Jacques Périard (1998) and Zili Li (2002). In 1990, he published the book “Three-dimensional Elastic Bodies in Rolling Contact”. He died aged 72 due to a heart failure, 24 April 2006.
