= Šentlambert =

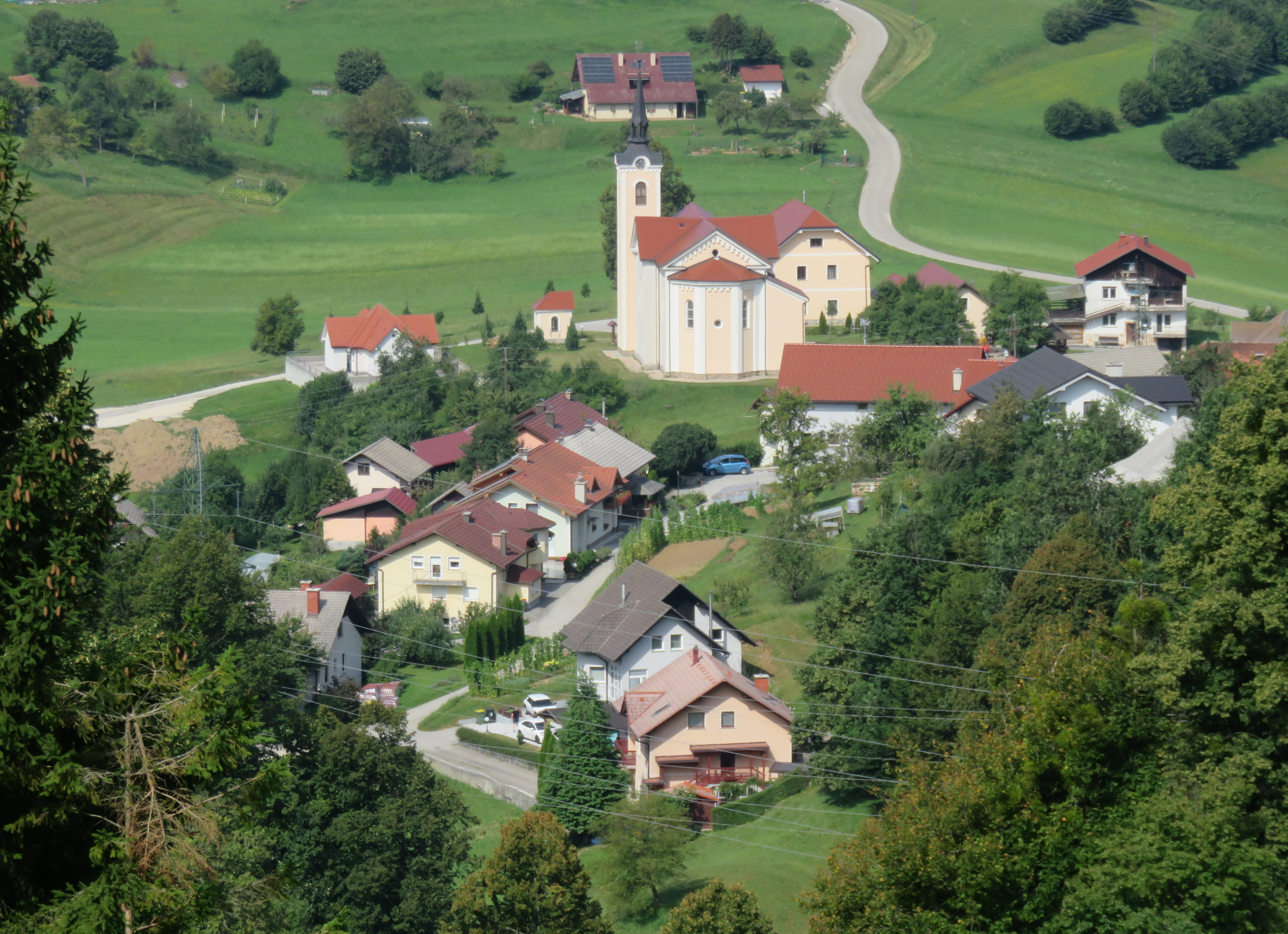

- Location in Slovenia
- Coordinates: 46°6′39.96″N 14°56′6.2″E
- Country: Slovenia
- Traditional region: Upper Carniola
- Statistical region: Central Sava
- Municipality: Zagorje ob Savi

Area
  - Total: 0.76 km^{2} (0.29 sq mi)
- Elevation: 571.7 m (1,876 ft)

Population (2002)
  - Total: 81
- Postal code: 1410

Šentlambert (pronounced [ʃɛntˈlaːmbɛɾt] or [ʃəntˈlaːmbɛɾt]; in older sources also Šent Lampert, German: Sankt Lamprecht) is a village in the hills west of Zagorje ob Savi in central Slovenia. The area is part of the traditional region of Upper Carniola. It is now included with the rest of the Municipality of Zagorje ob Savi in the Central Sava Statistical Region.

== Church ==
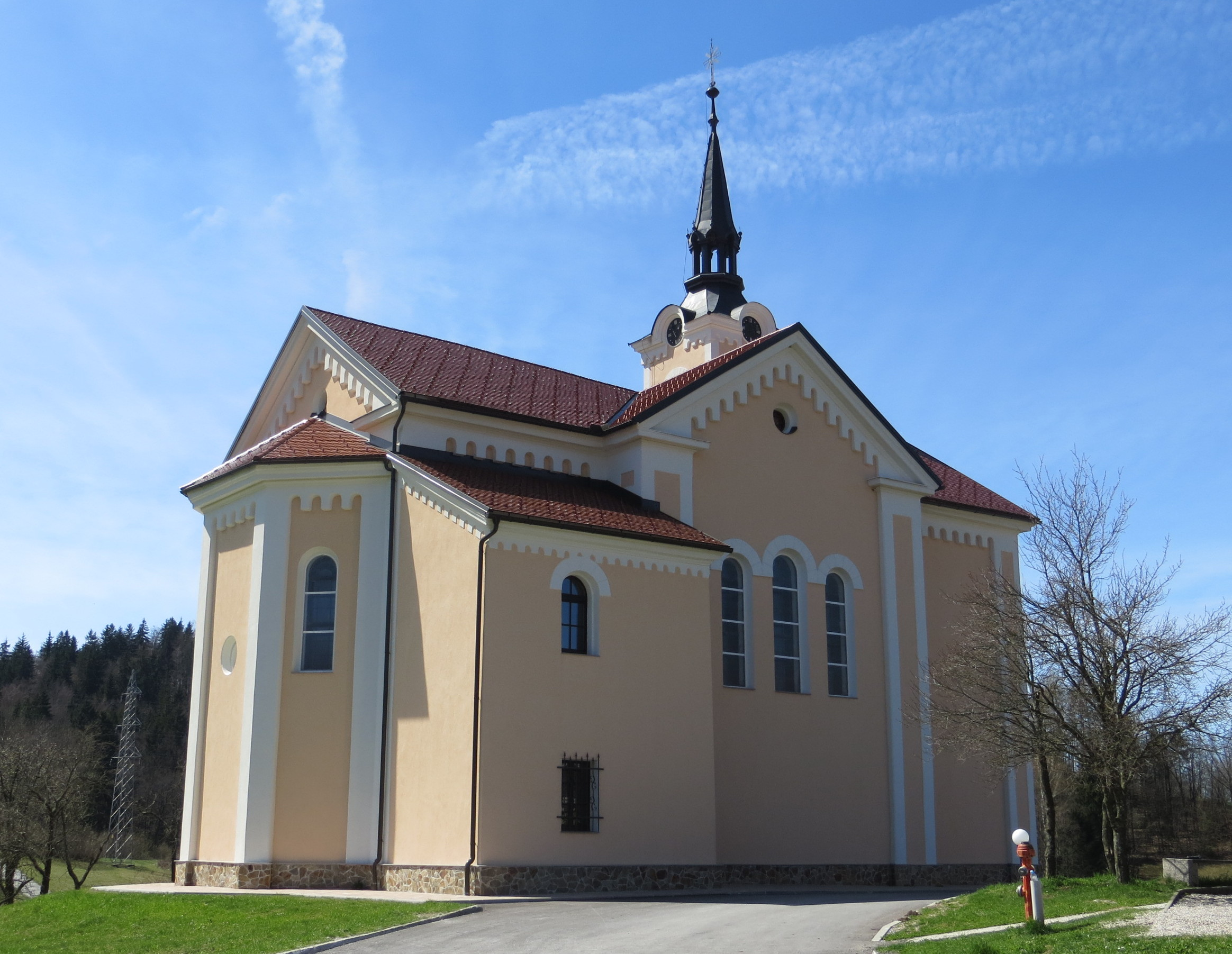
Saint Lambert's Church

The local parish church, from which the settlement gets its name, is dedicated to Saint Lambert and belongs to the Roman Catholic Archdiocese of Ljubljana. It is a Neo-Romanesque building dating to 1867.
