= Microsuction tape =

Material with adhesive properties that does not use an adhesive

Microsuction tape is a material for sticking objects to surfaces such as furniture, dashboards, walls, etc. One side is usually attached to the base surface by a classical adhesive. Objects are attached to the other side by pressing them against the tape. They stick to the tape due to small bubbles (cavities) on the surface of the tape. These contain air, which is squeezed out when the surface of an object is pressed against the surface of the tape. Due to sealing properties of the material, when the object is pulled off the surface, a vacuum is created in the cavities. Due to external air pressure, this creates a force that prevents the object from being removed from the surface, a mechanism similar to that of a suction cup.

When a large enough surface area of the object is pressed onto the tape, considerable force is necessary in order to detach the object by pulling it off. The mechanism is similar to that of a suction cup, where a well attached cup with a radius of 2 cm (with no air left between the cup and the surface) would require a force of about 130 newtons to detach it from the surface. For micro-suction tape, the necessary force is proportional to the attachment surface area. Compared to a suction cup, the force is smaller for the tape (assuming the same attachment surface area) because only a portion of the surface area contains craters that form vacuum chambers, and the maximal force factor is determined by this portion.

Force by which an object is attached to the tape can be controlled by the force with which the object is pushed against the tape. A softer push against the tape will squeeze less air from the craters on the tape's surface, reducing the difference between external air pressure and pressure in the created vacuum chambers, which essentially generates the force holding the object against the tape.

As described above, a significant force is necessary to detach the object by pulling it away from the tape in a perpendicular direction. Using this method, the total force of all vacuum chambers must be counteracted at once. However, it is easy to peel the tape from the object starting at the edge of the contact area. Using this method, only a small number of vacuum chambers are detached at a time, and each chamber generates only a weak opposing force due to its small surface.

In order to ensure a reliable long-term grip, surface bubbles must be well sealed after object attachment and must not leak air. The tape must be made of material that is not permeable by air. It must be soft in order to adapt to surface roughness of the attached objects and provide good sealing, therefore objects with rough surfaces can not be attached reliably, and this kind of tape does not work well for objects made of porous materials permeable by air.

In some applications, attachment may be improved by combining other mechanisms, such as high friction between the tape and objects attached to it. Friction force is not significantly reduced over time and it does not depend significantly on contact area. Specific traction (force per surface unit) is roughly proportional to contact pressure. If contact surface area is reduced (at the same gravity force acting on the object laid on the tape), both contact pressure (stress component normal to the contact surface) and specific traction (shear stress - tangential component) increase proportionally, which yields similar (not reduced) friction force.

Other approaches are also considered for devices with similar function, such as those inspired by animals that are capable of scaling vertical walls and ceilings, e.g. geckos, tree frogs and some insects. See sticky pad and gecko tape for more detailed information.

== See also ==
- Gecko tape
- Sticky pad
- Adhesive tape
- Suction cup
- Contact mechanics
- Vacuum
