= Lubrication (disambiguation) =

Lubrication is the process of using a lubricant to reduce friction between two contacting surfaces.

Lubrication may also refer to:

== Physics ==
- Acoustic lubrication
- Hydrodynamic lubrication
- Lubrication theory
- Boundary lubrication

== Other uses ==
- Vaginal lubrication

== See also ==
- Lubricant
- Personal lubricant
