= Sticky pad =

Sticky pads are friction devices used to prevent objects from sliding on a surface, by effectively increasing the friction between the object and the surface.

Sticky pads are used to fix items to otherwise smooth surface that are leaned or that moves, so that objects put on that surface could off due to insufficient friction when the surface inclines or moves. The pad has large friction coefficient both with the base surface and with the item laid on it, which prevent both the sticky pad from moving with respect to the surface, and objects laid on the pad from moving relative to the pad. Sticky pads are commonly used on car dashboards where forces caused by acceleration of the vehicle would cause objects put on dashboards slip off the otherwise smooth surface of the dashboard.

Contrary to fasteners, sticky pads do not affix objects to the surface. They merely prevent objects from slipping on the surface until the threshold acceleration or inclination angle is exceeded. Sticky pads also usually don't make use of adhesives. Because of this they are easily detached form the surface, and they need gravity to serve their purpose. In particular, the force acting on the object must have a component perpendicular on the surface and directed towards it. This is different from Microsuction tape where adhesion of object is achieved by microscopic bubbles on the surface that function as small suction cups. Sticky pads are made of rubber-like materials. This help dissipate kinetic energy when the base surface vibrates, such that object on the pad keep maintaining large enough contact surface with the pad and tangential friction forces keep preventing objects from slipping relative to the pad.

== Principle of operation ==
Although basic principles of sticky pads are simple, physics behind may be complex due to many specific and sometimes conflicting requirements arising from practical use. Mechanisms involved in high friction materials go beyond simple Coulomb friction. These can be combined by other mechanisms such as energy dissipation in viscous materials or adhesion.

The above requirements impose many design challenges. To operate well on vibrating surfaces, pads are usually made of soft, rubber like materials with very high friction coefficients. Designs seek to achieve certain level of adhesion (e.g. for use on vertical or very steep surfaces) without compromising easy detachment and continuous use without residual left-over. Some applications (such as sticking smartphones or tablets to vertical surface) require high degree of reliability, which is difficult to achieve without strong sticking to the surfaces.

Various innovative approaches and engineered materials are used to keep in line with requirements. Some designs apply sticking based on vacuum in addition to high friction and softness (see e.g. micro-suction tapes). Other development includes designs that find inspiration in nature, especially in animals that are able to climb walls and ceilings such as geckos, various species of insects , tree frogs , or chameleons.

Mechanisms of insects that can scale walls and ceilings help understand how to produce surfaces with extremely high friction that don't exhibit too much sticking for practical applications. Abilities of geckos have been intensively studied to find out how sticking of vertical walls or ceilings can be joined with ability of easy and quick detachment that enables geckos quick movement. It has been discovered that Van der Waals force rather than friction or adhesion is the most important mechanism behind gecko's abilities. This implies that artificial designs mimicking geckos' feet should rely on maximizing surface contact between object and the pad, which is less practical in some situations, for example when pads are used on non-flat surfaces or when objects put on the pad don't have flat surfaces. On the other hand, mechanisms in geckos' feet help design materials with reliable sticking and easy detachment at the same time. Mechanisms used in geckos, tree frogs and some insects were also studied for self-cleaning ability, which would enable artificial materials retain the ability to prevent sliding after continuous use in dirty environments.

== See also ==
- Microsuction tape
- Suction cup
- Adhesive tape
- Sticky mat
- Hook and loop fastener
- Friction
- Contact mechanics
- Frictional contact mechanics
