= Friction Acoustics =

Acoustics of Friction

Solid bodies in contact that undergo shear relative motion (friction) radiate energy. Part of this energy is radiated directly into the surrounding fluid media, and another part radiates throughout the solid bides and the connecting boundary conditions. The coupling of structural vibration and acoustic radiation takes is rooted in the mechanism of atomic oscillations, by which kinetic energy is translated to thermal energy.

This field involves principles of acoustics, solid mechanics, contact dynamics, and tribology.

== Coupling and Stick-Slip ==
Vibrational energy induced by either kinetic or breakaway friction can cause modal excitation of a subset of the contacting bodies or the vibratory coupling of the multiple bodies, depending on the strength of coupling.

Friction noise can be the product of multiple distinct dynamic processes, sliding and stick-slip. Sliding generally leads to stick-slip under a decreasing friction-velocity relation, or other unstable oscillations.

== Weak Contact ==
When normal forces are low, the solid bodies vibratory modes are weakly excited. The resulting noise generated is known as roughness noise. This noise is largely broad-band near the surface, and radiation efficiency and material geometry dictates which frequency content is radiated into the far field.

Surfaces that are relatively smooth, or well-lubricated, low normal forces, and low relative velocities are prone to set conditions for this regime, and avoid stick-slip.

== Strong Contact ==
Under some conditions, the radiated energy is high at the mechanical eigenmodes of the coupled system. This conditions is more likely under higher roughness, higher normal loads, and higher relative sliding velocities.

== Empirical Relationships ==
A review of observed relationships between sound pressure due to friction and parameters such as normal force, roughness, and sliding velocity is provided by Feng et al.
