= Transient friction loading =

Transient friction loading is the mechanical stress induced on an object due to transient or vibrational frictional forces.

== Examples ==
A classic example of transient friction loading is the wooden block sliding over an unlevel, non-planar surface. Due to the transient response of the contact force, the resultant frictional force is noisy. The induced stress is concisely described as transient friction loading.

Another is the internal stresses on a hydraulic ram operating in a vibrational environment. Due to the oscillatory nature of the acceleration experienced by the ram, in n-dimensions, the resulting frictional response is described as transient friction loading.

== See also ==
- Tribology
- Frictionless plane
