= Particle damping =

Particle damping is the use of particles moving freely in a cavity to produce a damping effect.

== Introduction ==
Active and passive damping techniques are common methods of attenuating the resonant vibrations excited in a structure. Active damping techniques are not applicable under all circumstances due, for example, to power requirements, cost, environment, etc. Under such circumstances, passive damping techniques are a viable alternative. Various forms of passive damping exist, including viscous damping, viscoelastic damping, friction damping, and impact damping. Viscous and viscoelastic damping usually have a relatively strong dependence on temperature. Friction dampers, while applicable over wide temperature ranges, may degrade with wear. Due to these limitations, attention has been focused on impact dampers, particularly for application in cryogenic environments or at elevated temperatures.

Particle damping technology is a derivative of impact damping with several advantages. Impact damping refers to only a single (somewhat larger) auxiliary mass in a cavity, whereas particle damping is used to imply multiple auxiliary masses of small size in a cavity. The principle behind particle damping is the removal of vibratory energy through losses that occur during impact of granular particles which move freely within the boundaries of a cavity attached to a primary system. In practice, particle dampers are highly nonlinear dampers whose energy dissipation, or damping, is derived from a combination of loss mechanisms, including friction and momentum exchange. Because of the ability of particle dampers to perform through a wide range of temperatures and frequencies and survive for a longer life, they have been used in applications such as the weightless environments of outer space, in aircraft structures, to attenuate vibrations of civil structures, and even in tennis rackets.

== Advantages of particle dampers ==
- They can perform in a large range of temperature without loss of temperature.
- They can survive for a long life.
- They can perform in a very wide range of frequencies, unlike viscoelastic dampers, which are highly frequency dependent.
- The particles placed inside a cavity in a structure can be less in weight than the mass they replace.
- Through analyses, one can find the right kind, size and consistency of particles for the given application.

Therefore, they are suited for applications where there is a need for long service in harsh environments.

== Analysis of particle damping ==
The analysis of particle dampers is mainly conducted by experimental testing, simulations by discrete element method or finite element method, and by analytical calculations. The discrete element method makes use of particle mechanics, whereby individual particles are modeled with 6-degrees of freedom dynamics and their interactions result in the amount of energy absorbed/dissipated. This approach, although requires high power computing and the dynamic interactions of millions of particles, it is promising and may be used to estimate the effects of various mechanisms on damping. For instance, a study was performed using a model that simulated 10,000 particles in a cavity and studied the damping under various gravitational force effects.

== Research literature review ==
A significant amount of research has been carried out in the area of analysis of particle dampers.

Olson presented a mathematical model that allows particle damper designs to be evaluated analytically. The model utilized the particle dynamics method and took into account the physics involved in particle damping, including frictional contact interactions and energy dissipation due to viscoelasticity of the particle material.

Fowler et al. discussed results of studies into the effectiveness and predictability of particle damping. Efforts were concentrated on characterizing and predicting the behaviour of a range of potential particle materials, shapes, and sizes in the laboratory environment, as well as at elevated temperature. Methodologies used to generate data and extract the characteristics of the nonlinear damping phenomena were illustrated with test results.

Fowler et al. developed an analytical method, based on the particle dynamics method, that used characterized particle damping data to predict damping in structural systems. A methodology to design particle damping for dynamic structures was discussed. The design methodology was correlated with tests on a structural component in the laboratory.

Mao et al. utilized DEM for computer simulation of particle damping. By considering thousands of particles as Hertz balls, the discrete element model was used to describe the motions of these multi-bodies and determine the energy dissipation.

Prasad et al. have investigated the damping performance of twenty different granular materials, which can be used to design particle dampers for different industries. They have also introduced the hybrid particle damper concept in which two different types of granular materials are mixed in order to achieve significantly higher vibration reduction in comparison to the particle dampers with a single type of granular materials.

Prasad et al. have developed a honeycomb damping plate concept, based on particle damping technique, to reduce low-frequency vibration amplitude from an onshore wind turbine generator.

Prasad et al. have suggested three different strategies to implement particle dampers in a wind turbine blade to reduce the vibration amplitude.
