= Carlton E. Lemke =

American mathematician (1920-2004)

Carlton Edward Lemke
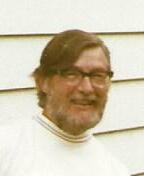
- Lemke in Albany, New York, August 1970
- Born: October 11, 1920; Buffalo, New York
- Died: April 12, 2004 (aged 83); Tucson, Arizona
- Citizenship: American
- Education: Carnegie Mellon University
- Known for: Lemke–Howson algorithm Lemke's algorithm
- Awards: John von Neumann Theory Prize (1978)
- Scientific career
- Fields: Mathematics
- Workplaces: Rensselaer Polytechnic Institute
- Doctoral advisor: Abraham Charnes

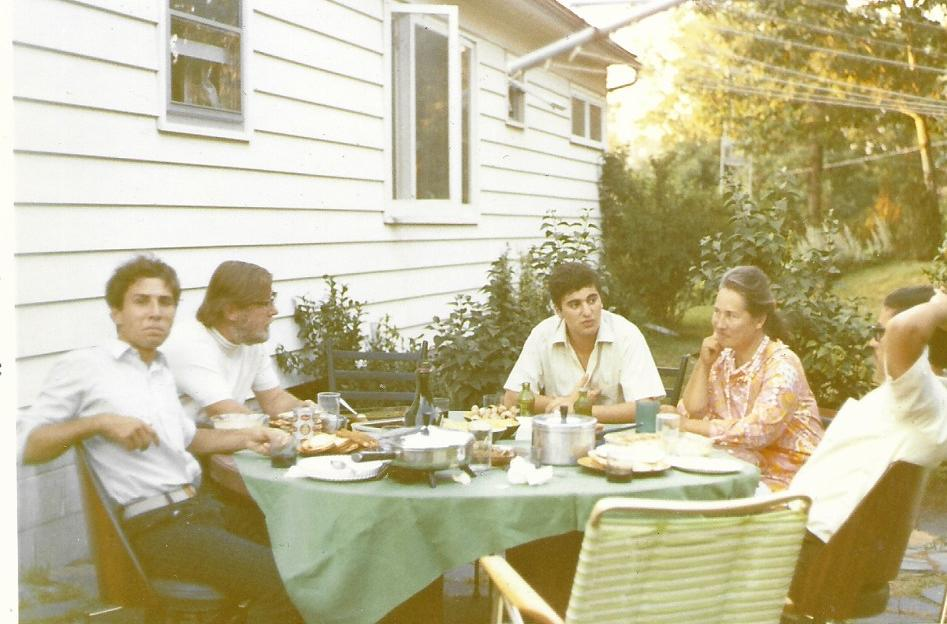
With wife Martha Lemke 2nd right and friends T. Henry-Labordère (France), E. Zerhouni, C. Zerhouni (Algeria)

Carlton Edward Lemke (October 11, 1920 – April 12, 2004) was an American mathematician.

After fighting in WWII with the 82nd Airborne Division, then under a GI grant, he received his bachelor's degree in 1949 at the University of Buffalo and his PhD (Extremal Problems in Linear Inequalities) in 1953 at Carnegie Mellon University (then Carnegie Institute of Technology). In 1952–1954 he was instructor at the Carnegie Institute of Technology and in 1954–55 at the Knolls Atomic Power Laboratory of General Electric. In 1955–56 he was an engineer at the Radio Corporation of America in New Jersey. From 1956 he was assistant professor and later professor at the Rensselaer Polytechnic Institute. Since 1967, he was there Ford Foundation Professor of Mathematics.

His research is in Algebra, Mathematical Programming, Operations Research, and Statistics. In 1954 Lemke developed the dual simplex method, independently from E. M. L. Beale.

In 1962 he developed for the convex quadratic linear programming case a new simplex method using an original complementary pivotal scheme which yields at each simplex tableau a current solution with one artificial variable $z_0$ ('Lemke start') and $\overrightarrow {x} \cdot \overrightarrow {u} = x_ru_r > 0$, which is primal $\overrightarrow {x} >= \overrightarrow 0$ feasible and dual $\overrightarrow {u} >=\overrightarrow 0$ feasible but the artificial variable $z_0>0$ which becomes $=0$ at the optimum. This is the core method for his subsequent constructive proof(1964) that the number of Nash( bimatrix) equilibrium points is odd.

He is then also known for his contribution to game theory. In 1964 Lemke (with J. T. Howson) constructed an algorithm for finding Nash equilibria the case of finite two-person games. For this work Lemke received in 1978 the John von Neumann Theory Prize. He was elected to the 2002 class of Fellows of the Institute for Operations Research and the Management Sciences.

== Selected bibliography ==
- Lemke, Carlton E. The dual method of solving the linear programming problem, Naval Research Logistics Quarterly, Vol. 1, 1954, pp. 36–47
- Lemke C. E. A Method of Solution for Quadratic Programs, Management Science, 8(4),1962, pp. 442-453
- Lemke, Carlton E. and J. T. Howson. Equilibrium points of bimatrix games, Journal of the SIAM, Volume 12, 1964, pp. 413–423
