= Lemke's algorithm =

In mathematical optimization, Lemke's algorithm is a procedure for solving linear complementarity problems, and more generally mixed linear complementarity problems. It is named after Carlton E. Lemke.

Lemke's algorithm is of pivoting or basis-exchange type. Similar algorithms can compute Nash equilibria for two-person matrix and bimatrix games.
