= Acoustic lubrication =

Acoustic lubrication or sonic lubrication occurs when sound (measurable in a vacuum by placing a microphone on one element of the sliding system) permits vibration to introduce separation between the sliding faces. This could happen between two plates or between a series of particles. The frequency of sound required to induce optimal vibration, and thus cause sonic lubrication, varies with the size of the particles (high frequencies will have the desired, or undesired, effect on sand and lower frequencies will have this effect on boulders).

== Examples ==
If there is a dynamic coefficient of friction between two objects of 0.20, and vibration causes them to be in contact only half of the time, that would be equivalent to a constant coefficient of friction of 0.10. This substantial reduction in friction can have a profound effect on the system. According to anecdote, World War II Panzer tank treads may have been lubricated by their own squeak providing a serendipitous example of acoustic lubrication.

Another example occurs during landslides. Most landslides do not involve this effect, but occasionally the frequency of vibrations caused by the landslide is optimal to make the boulders vibrate. In this case, feedback causes the boulders to slide much further and more quickly than typical, which can pose an increased danger to those in their path. One notable feature of such a landslide is that it appears to resemble flowing water, or mud, and not the dry sliding rocks which they were seconds earlier.

== Applications ==
Besides the study of landslides, there could be many other applications for acoustic lubrication, particularly where variable friction is required or traditional lubricants cannot be used. One case might be drilling wells (for water, oil, etc.) through sand. The optimal pitch of the sound (measurement of frequency) could reduce the friction between the drill bit and sand considerably. New razors with a vibrating head may also be an example.

== In fiction ==
- The protagonist in the video game Shadow Complex can acquire a "friction dampener" that uses acoustic lubrication; this enables him to run at very high speeds.

== See also ==
- Friction
