= Nonlinear complementarity problem =

Mathematics problem

In applied mathematics, a nonlinear complementarity problem (NCP) with respect to a mapping ƒ : R^{n} → R^{n}, denoted by NCPƒ, is to find a vector x ∈ R^{n} such that

$$x \geq 0,\ f(x) \geq 0 \text{ and } x^{T}f(x)=0$$

where ƒ(x) is a smooth mapping. The case of a discontinuous mapping was discussed by Habetler and Kostreva (1978).
