= Mixed linear complementarity problem =

Method in linear algebra

In mathematical optimization theory, the mixed linear complementarity problem, often abbreviated as MLCP or LMCP, is a generalization of the linear complementarity problem to include free variables.
