= Friction =

Force resisting sliding motion

The blue plate has more friction on the sloped surface than the green one, and thus slides down more slowly

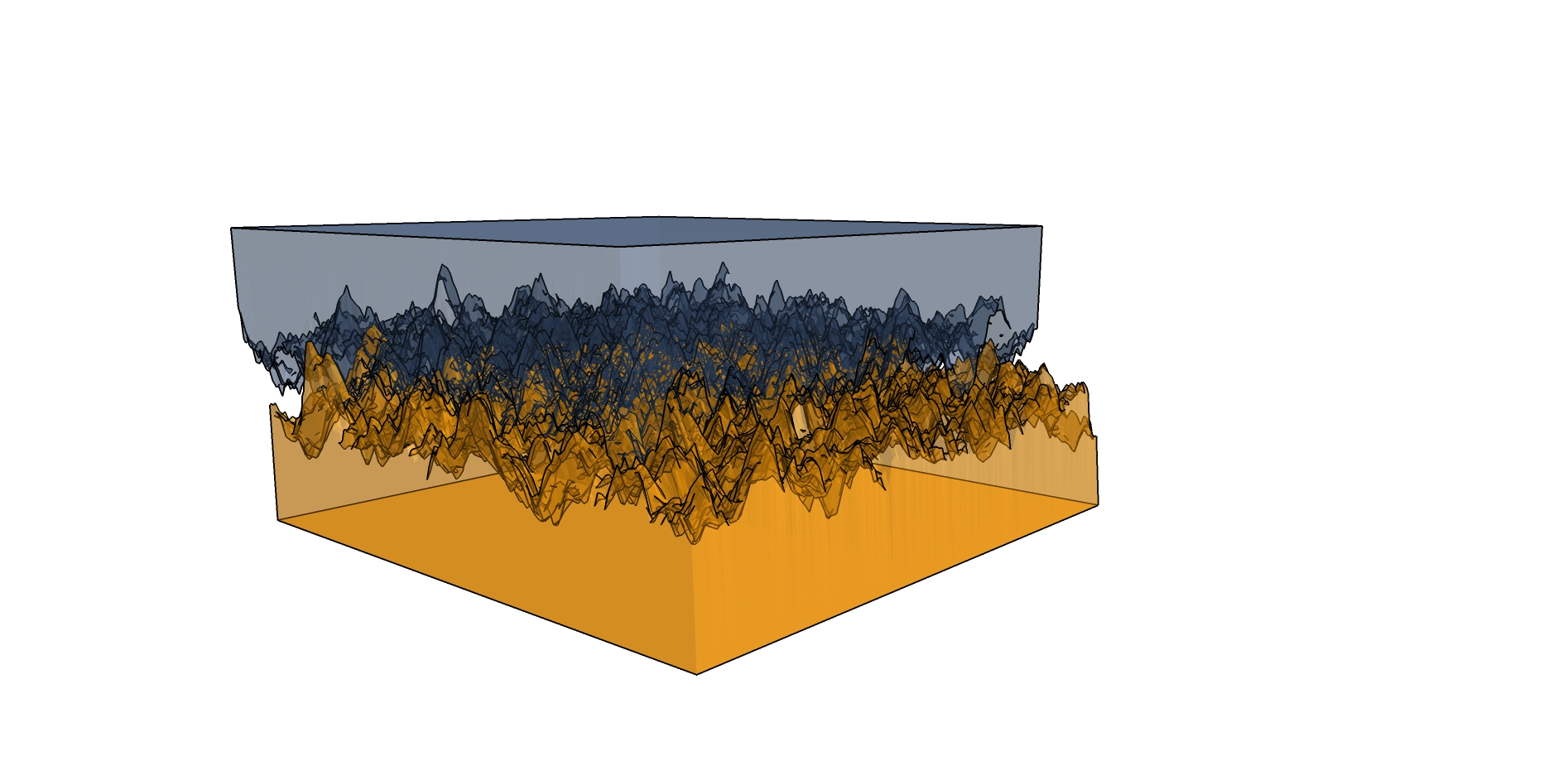
Simulated blocks with fractal rough surfaces, exhibiting static frictional interactions

Friction is the force resisting the relative motion of solid surfaces, fluid layers, and material elements sliding or grinding against each other. Types of friction include dry, fluid, lubricated, skin, and internal – an incomplete list. The study of the processes involved is called tribology, and has a history of more than 2,000 years.

Friction can have dramatic consequences, as illustrated by the use of friction created by rubbing pieces of wood together to start a fire. Another important consequence of many types of friction can be wear, which may lead to performance degradation or damage to components. It is known that frictional energy losses account for about 20% of the total energy expenditure of the world.

There are many different contributors to the retarding force in friction, ranging from asperity deformation to the generation of charges and changes in local structure. When two bodies in contact move relative to each other, due to these various contributors some mechanical energy is transformed to heat, the free energy of structural changes, and other types of dissipation. The total dissipated energy per unit distance moved is the retarding frictional force, F=E/d. The complexity of the interactions involved makes the calculation of friction from first principles difficult, and it is often easier to use empirical methods for analysis and the development of theory.

== Types ==
There are several types of friction:

- Dry friction is a force that opposes the relative lateral motion of two solid surfaces in contact. Dry friction is subdivided into static friction ("stiction") between non-moving surfaces, and kinetic friction between moving surfaces. With the exception of atomic or molecular friction, dry friction generally arises from the interaction of surface features, known as asperities (see Figure).
- Fluid friction describes the friction between layers of a viscous fluid that are moving relative to each other.
- Lubricated friction is a case of fluid friction where a lubricant fluid separates two solid surfaces.
- Skin friction is a component of drag, the force resisting the motion of a fluid across the surface of a body.
- Internal friction is the force resisting motion between the elements making up a solid material while it undergoes deformation.

== History ==
Many ancient authors including Aristotle, Vitruvius, and Pliny the Elder, were interested in the cause and mitigation of friction. They were aware of differences between static and kinetic friction with Themistius stating in 350 A.D. that "it is easier to further the motion of a moving body than to move a body at rest".

The classic laws of sliding friction were discovered by Leonardo da Vinci in 1493, a pioneer in tribology, but the laws documented in his notebooks were not published and remained unknown. These laws were rediscovered by Guillaume Amontons in 1699 and became known as Amonton's three laws of dry friction. Amontons presented the nature of friction in terms of surface irregularities and the force required to raise the weight pressing the surfaces together. This view was further elaborated by Bernard Forest de Bélidor and Leonhard Euler (1750), who derived the angle of repose of a weight on an inclined plane and first distinguished between static and kinetic friction. John Theophilus Desaguliers (1734) first recognized the role of adhesion in friction. Microscopic forces cause surfaces to stick together; he proposed that friction was the force necessary to tear the adhering surfaces apart.

The understanding of friction was further developed by Charles-Augustin de Coulomb (1785). Coulomb investigated the influence of four main factors on friction: the nature of the materials in contact and their surface coatings, the extent of the surface area, the normal pressure (or load), and the length of time that the surfaces remained in contact (time of repose). Coulomb further considered the influence of sliding velocity, temperature and humidity, in order to decide between the different explanations on the nature of friction that had been proposed. The distinction between static and dynamic friction is made in Coulomb's friction law (see below), although this distinction was already drawn by Johann Andreas von Segner in 1758. The effect of the time of repose was explained by Pieter van Musschenbroek (1762) by considering the surfaces of fibrous materials, with fibers meshing together, which takes a finite time in which the friction increases.

John Leslie (1766–1832) noted a weakness in the views of Amontons and Coulomb: If friction arises from a weight being drawn up the inclined plane of successive asperities, then why is it not balanced through descending the opposite slope? Leslie was equally skeptical about the role of adhesion proposed by Desaguliers, which should on the whole have the same tendency to accelerate as to retard the motion. In Leslie's view, friction should be seen as a time-dependent process of flattening, pressing down asperities, which creates new obstacles in what were cavities before.

Heat by friction captured by a thermal camera

In the long course of the development of the law of conservation of energy and of the first law of thermodynamics, friction was recognised as a mode of conversion of mechanical work into heat. In 1798, Benjamin Thompson reported on cannon boring experiments.

Arthur Jules Morin (1833) developed the concept of sliding versus rolling friction.

In 1842, Julius Robert Mayer frictionally generated heat in paper pulp and measured the temperature rise. In 1845, Joule published a paper entitled "The Mechanical Equivalent of Heat", in which he specified a numerical value for the amount of mechanical work required to "produce a unit of heat", based on the friction of an electric current passing through a resistor, and on the friction of a paddle wheel rotating in a vat of water.

Osborne Reynolds (1866) derived the equation of viscous flow. This completed the classic empirical model of friction (static, kinetic, and fluid) commonly used today in engineering. In 1877, Fleeming Jenkin and J. A. Ewing investigated the continuity between static and kinetic friction.

In 1907, G.H. Bryan published an investigation of the foundations of thermodynamics, Thermodynamics: an Introductory Treatise dealing mainly with First Principles and their Direct Applications. He noted that for a rough body driven over a rough surface, the mechanical work done by the driver exceeds the mechanical work received by the surface. The lost work is accounted for by heat generated by friction.

Over the years, for example in his 1879 thesis, but particularly in 1926, Planck advocated regarding the generation of heat by rubbing as the most specific way to define heat, and the prime example of an irreversible thermodynamic process.

The focus of research during the 20th century has been to understand the physical mechanisms behind friction. Frank Philip Bowden and David Tabor (1950) showed that, at a microscopic level, the actual area of contact between surfaces is a very small fraction of the apparent area. This actual area of contact, caused by asperities increases with pressure. The development of the atomic force microscope (ca. 1986) enabled scientists to study friction at the atomic scale, showing that, on that scale, dry friction is the product of the inter-surface shear stress and the contact area. These two discoveries explain Amonton's first law (below); the macroscopic proportionality between normal force and static frictional force between dry surfaces.

== Dry friction ==
Dry friction resists relative lateral motion of two solid surfaces in contact. The two regimes of dry friction are 'static friction' ("stiction") between non-moving surfaces, and kinetic friction (sometimes called sliding friction or dynamic friction) between moving surfaces.

The force of friction is always exerted in a direction that opposes movement (for kinetic friction) or potential movement (for static friction) between the two surfaces. For example, a curling stone sliding along the ice experiences a kinetic force slowing it down. For an example of potential movement, the drive wheels of an accelerating car experience a frictional force pointing forward; if they did not, the wheels would spin, and the rubber would slide backwards along the pavement. Note that it is not the direction of movement of the vehicle they oppose, it is the direction of (potential) sliding between tire and road.

The elementary property of sliding (kinetic) friction were discovered by experiment in the 15th to 18th century and were expressed as three empirical laws:

- Amontons' first law: The force of friction is directly proportional to the applied load.
- Amontons' second law: The force of friction is independent of the apparent area of contact.
- Coulomb's law of friction: Kinetic friction is independent of the sliding velocity.

Coulomb friction, named after Charles-Augustin de Coulomb, is an approximate model used to calculate the force of dry friction. It is governed by the model:
$$F_\mathrm{f} \leq \mu F_\mathrm{n},$$
where

- $F_\mathrm{f}$ is the force of friction exerted by each surface on the other. It is parallel to the surface, in a direction opposite to the net applied force.
- $\mu$ is the coefficient of friction, which is an empirical property of the contacting materials,
- $F_\mathrm{n}$ is the normal force exerted by each surface on the other, directed perpendicular (normal) to the surface.

The Coulomb friction $F_\mathrm{f}$ may take any value from zero up to $\mu F_\mathrm{n}$, and the direction of the frictional force against a surface is opposite to the motion that surface would experience in the absence of friction. Thus, in the static case, the frictional force is exactly what it must be in order to prevent motion between the surfaces; it balances the net force tending to cause such motion. In this case, rather than providing an estimate of the actual frictional force, the Coulomb approximation provides a threshold value for this force, above which motion would commence. This maximum force is known as traction.

=== Static friction ===
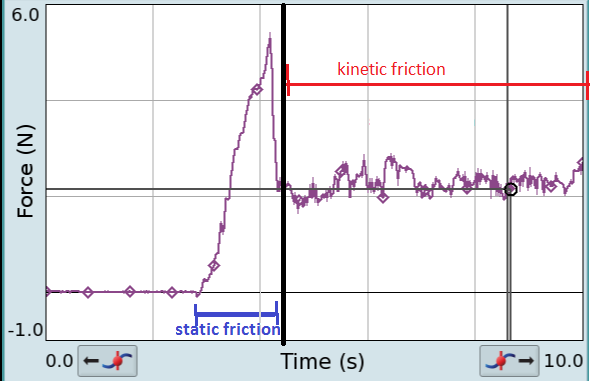
When the mass is not moving, the object experiences static friction. The friction increases as the applied force increases until the block moves. After the block moves, it experiences kinetic friction, which is less than the maximum static friction.

Static friction is friction between two or more solid objects that are not moving relative to each other. For example, static friction can prevent an object from sliding down a sloped surface. The coefficient of static friction, typically denoted as μ_{s}, is usually higher than the coefficient of kinetic friction. Static friction is considered to arise as the result of surface roughness features across multiple length scales at solid surfaces. These features, known as asperities are present down to nano-scale dimensions and result in true solid to solid contact existing only at a limited number of points accounting for only a fraction of the apparent or nominal contact area. The linearity between applied load and true contact area, arising from asperity deformation, gives rise to the linearity between static frictional force and normal force, found for typical Amonton–Coulomb type friction.

The static friction force acts in the opposing direction to an applied force. This must be overcome before an object can move. The maximum possible friction force between two surfaces before sliding begins is the product of the coefficient of static friction and the normal force: $F_\text{max} = \mu_\mathrm{s} F_\text{n}$. When there is no sliding occurring, the friction force can have any value from zero up to $F_\text{max}$. Any force smaller than $F_\text{max}$ attempting to slide one surface over the other is opposed by a frictional force of equal magnitude and opposite direction. Any force larger than $F_\text{max}$ overcomes the force of static friction and causes sliding to occur. The instant sliding occurs, static friction is no longer applicable—the friction between the two surfaces is then called kinetic friction. However, an apparent static friction can be observed even in the case when the true static friction is zero.

An example of static friction is the force that prevents a car wheel from slipping as it rolls on the ground. Even though the wheel is in motion, the patch of the tire in contact with the ground is stationary relative to the ground, so it is static rather than kinetic friction. Upon slipping, the wheel friction changes to kinetic friction. An anti-lock braking system operates on the principle of allowing a locked wheel to resume rotating so that the car maintains static friction.

The maximum value of static friction, when motion is impending, is sometimes referred to as limiting friction, although this term is not used universally.

=== Kinetic friction ===
Kinetic friction, also known as dynamic friction or sliding friction, occurs when two objects are moving relative to each other and rub together (like a sled on the ground). The coefficient of kinetic friction is typically denoted as μ_{k}, and is usually less than the coefficient of static friction for the same materials. However, Richard Feynman comments that "with dry metals it is very hard to show any difference." The friction force between two surfaces after sliding begins is the product of the coefficient of kinetic friction and the normal force: $F_{k} = \mu_\mathrm{k} F_{n}$. This is responsible for the Coulomb damping of an oscillating or vibrating system.

=== Role of the normal force ===
Free-body diagram for a block on a ramp. Arrows are vectors indicating directions and magnitudes of forces. N is the normal force, mg is the force of gravity, and F_{f} is the force of friction.

The normal force is defined as the net force compressing two parallel surfaces together, and its direction is perpendicular to the surfaces. In the simple case of a mass resting on a horizontal surface, the only component of the normal force is the force due to gravity, where $N=mg\,$. In this case, conditions of equilibrium tell us that the magnitude of the friction force is zero, $F_f = 0$. In fact, the friction force always satisfies $F_f\le \mu N$, with equality reached only at a critical ramp angle (given by $\tan^{-1}\mu$) that is steep enough to initiate sliding.

The friction coefficient is an empirical (experimentally measured) structural property that depends only on various aspects of the contacting materials, such as surface roughness. The coefficient of friction is not a function of mass or volume. For instance, a large aluminum block has the same coefficient of friction as a small aluminum block. However, the magnitude of the friction force itself depends on the normal force, and hence on the mass of the block.

Depending on the situation, the calculation of the normal force $N$ might include forces other than gravity. If an object is on a level surface and subjected to an external force $P$ tending to cause it to slide, then the normal force between the object and the surface is just $N = mg + P_y$, where $mg$ is the block's weight and $P_y$ is the downward component of the external force. Prior to sliding, this friction force is $F_f = -P_x$, where $P_x$ is the horizontal component of the external force. Thus, $F_f \le \mu N$ in general. Sliding commences only after this frictional force reaches the value $F_f = \mu N$. Until then, friction is whatever it needs to be to provide equilibrium, so it can be treated as simply a reaction.

If the object is on a tilted surface such as an inclined plane, the normal force from gravity is smaller than $mg$, because less of the force of gravity is perpendicular to the face of the plane. The normal force and the frictional force are ultimately determined using vector analysis, usually via a free body diagram.

In general, process for solving any statics problem with friction is to treat contacting surfaces tentatively as immovable so that the corresponding tangential reaction force between them can be calculated. If this frictional reaction force satisfies $F_f \le \mu N$, then the tentative assumption was correct, and it is the actual frictional force. Otherwise, the friction force must be set equal to $F_f = \mu N$, and then the resulting force imbalance would then determine the acceleration associated with slipping.

Angle of friction, θ, when block just starts to slide

=== Role of angle ===
For certain applications, it is more useful to define static friction in terms of the maximum angle before which one of the items will begin sliding. This is called the angle of friction or friction angle. It is defined as:
$$\tan{\theta} = \mu_\mathrm{s}$$
and thus:
$$\theta = \arctan{\mu_\mathrm{s}}$$
where $\theta$ is the angle from horizontal and μ_{s} is the static coefficient of friction between the objects. This formula can also be used to calculate μ_{s} from empirical measurements of the friction angle.

== Coefficient of friction ==
The coefficient of friction (COF), often symbolized by the Greek letter μ, is a dimensionless scalar value which equals the ratio of the force of friction between two bodies and the force pressing them together, either during or at the onset of slipping. The coefficient of friction depends on the materials used; for example, ice on steel has a low coefficient of friction, while rubber on pavement has a high coefficient of friction. Coefficients of friction range from near zero to greater than one. The coefficient of friction between two surfaces of similar metals is greater than that between two surfaces of different metals; for example, brass has a higher coefficient of friction when moved against brass, but less if moved against steel or aluminum.

For surfaces at rest relative to each other, $\mu = \mu_\mathrm{s}$, where $\mu_\mathrm{s}$ is the coefficient of static friction. This is usually larger than its kinetic counterpart. The coefficient of static friction exhibited by a pair of contacting surfaces depends upon the combined effects of material deformation characteristics and surface roughness, both of which have their origins in the chemical bonding between atoms in each of the bulk materials and between the material surfaces and any adsorbed material. The fractality of surfaces, a parameter describing the scaling behavior of surface asperities, is known to play an important role in determining the magnitude of the static friction.

For surfaces in relative motion $\mu = \mu_\mathrm{k}$, where $\mu_\mathrm{k}$ is the coefficient of kinetic friction. The Coulomb friction is equal to $F_\mathrm{f}$, and the frictional force on each surface is exerted in the direction opposite to its motion relative to the other surface.

Arthur Morin introduced the term and demonstrated the utility of the coefficient of friction. The coefficient of friction is an empirical measurement—it has to be measured experimentally, and cannot be found through calculations. Rougher surfaces tend to have higher effective values. Both static and kinetic coefficients of friction depend on the pair of surfaces in contact; for a given pair of surfaces, the coefficient of static friction is usually larger than that of kinetic friction; in some sets the two coefficients are equal, such as teflon-on-teflon.

Most dry materials in combination have friction coefficient values between 0.3 and 0.6. Values outside this range are rarer, but teflon, for example, can have a coefficient as low as 0.04. A value of zero would mean no friction at all, an elusive property. Rubber in contact with other surfaces can yield friction coefficients from 1 to 2. Occasionally it is maintained that μ is always < 1, but this is not true. While in most relevant applications μ < 1, a value above 1 merely implies that the force required to slide an object along the surface is greater than the normal force of the surface on the object. For example, silicone rubber or acrylic rubber-coated surfaces have a coefficient of friction that can be substantially larger than 1.

While it is often stated that the coefficient of friction is a "material property", it is better categorized as a "system property". Unlike true material properties (such as conductivity, dielectric constant, yield strength), the coefficient of friction for any two materials depends on system variables like temperature, velocity, atmosphere, and also what are now popularly described as aging and deaging times, as well as on geometric properties of the interface between the materials, namely surface structure. For example, a copper pin sliding against a thick copper plate can have a coefficient of friction that varies from 0.6 at low speeds (metal sliding against metal) to below 0.2 at high speeds when the copper surface begins to melt due to frictional heating. The latter speed, of course, does not determine the coefficient of friction uniquely; if the pin diameter is increased so that the frictional heating is removed rapidly, the temperature drops, the pin remains solid, and the coefficient of friction rises to that of a 'low speed' test.

In systems with significant non-uniform stress fields, because local slip occurs before the system slides, the macroscopic coefficient of static friction depends on the applied load, system size, or shape; Amontons' law is not satisfied macroscopically.

=== Approximate coefficients of friction ===
Materials		Static Friction, $\mu_\mathrm{s}$		Kinetic/Sliding Friction, $\mu_\mathrm{k}\,$	
Materials		Dry and clean	Lubricated	Dry and clean	Lubricated
Aluminium	Steel	0.61		0.47	
Aluminium	Aluminium	1.05–1.35	0.3	1.4–1.5	
Gold	Gold			2.5	
Platinum	Platinum	1.2	0.25	3.0	
Silver	Silver	1.4	0.55	1.5	
Alumina ceramic	Silicon nitride ceramic				0.004 (wet)
BAM (Ceramic alloy AlMgB_{14})	Titanium boride (TiB_{2})	0.04–0.05	0.02		
Brass	Steel	0.35–0.51	0.19	0.44	
Cast iron	Copper	1.05		0.29	
Cast iron	Zinc	0.85		0.21	
Concrete	Rubber	1.0	0.30 (wet)	0.6–0.85	0.45–0.75 (wet)
Concrete	Wood	0.62			
Copper	Glass	0.68		0.53	
Copper	Steel	0.53		0.36	0.18
Glass	Glass	0.9–1.0	0.005–0.01	0.4	0.09–0.116
Human synovial fluid	Human cartilage		0.01		0.003
Ice	Ice	0.02–0.09			
Polyethene	Steel	0.2	0.2		
PTFE (Teflon)	PTFE (Teflon)	0.04	0.04		0.04
Steel	Ice	0.03			
Steel	PTFE (Teflon)	0.04−0.2	0.04		0.04
Steel	Steel	0.74−0.80	0.005–0.23	0.42–0.62	0.029–0.19
Wood	Metal	0.2–0.6	0.2 (wet)	0.49	0.075
Wood	Wood	0.25–0.62	0.2 (wet)	0.32–0.48	0.067–0.167

== Sources of friction ==
The top image shows asperities under no load. The bottom image depicts the same surface after applying a load.

Friction is due to a range of energy dissipative processes. The base model, first detailed by Bowden and Tabor is that it involves contact of small protusions on surfaces called asperities. As the load increases the number and the area of asperity contacts increases, leading to the normal force dependence of friction. As these asperities slide past each other both plastic and elastic deformation processes take place, among others. The frictional force is the energy dissipated per unit distance by these, the net result often being the linear Coulomb formula mentioned earlier.

Experimental studies of dry sliding friction in engineering materials have shown that friction and wear are controlled not only by the nominal contact conditions, but also by near-surface microstructural evolution, debris generation and tribochemical transformations during sliding. Reviews and experimental studies have shown that plastic deformation, fracture, material transfer, mechanical mixing and oxidation can all contribute to the transition between mild and severe wear regimes in dry metal contacts.

The importance of debris and "third-body" material formed in the contact has also been demonstrated experimentally, since compacted triboparticulates may either accelerate damage or form protective interfacial layers that reduce direct metal-to-metal contact. In steels, dry sliding tests have shown that hardness level, load and sliding speed can strongly influence friction stability and wear rate, while oxidative wear may become dominant under suitable sliding conditions. Related work on stainless steels and titanium alloys further shows that dry sliding friction is highly sensitive to abrasive particle size, counterface material and the formation or breakdown of protective tribo-oxide layers, which can shift the governing wear mechanism from relatively mild oxidative behaviour to severe delamination or abrasive damage. Experimental investigations further indicate that environmental factors such as hydrogen charging, lubrication regime and cyclic loading may significantly influence crack initiation mechanisms and friction stability in structural alloys.

== Breakdown of the Coulomb model ==
Despite being a simplified model of friction, the Coulomb model is useful in many numerical simulation applications such as multibody systems and granular material. Even its most simple expression encapsulates the fundamental effects of sticking and sliding which are required in many applied cases, although specific algorithms have to be designed in order to efficiently numerically integrate mechanical systems with Coulomb friction and bilateral or unilateral contact. Some quite nonlinear effects, such as the so-called Painlevé paradoxes, may be encountered with Coulomb friction.

The Coulomb approximation follows from the assumptions that: surfaces are in atomically close contact only over a small fraction of their overall area; that this contact area is proportional to the normal force (until saturation, which takes place when all area is in atomic contact); and that the frictional force is proportional to the applied normal force, independently of the contact area; this comes from the asperity work of Bowden and Tabor. The Coulomb approximation is fundamentally an empirical construct. It is a rule-of-thumb describing the approximate outcome of an extremely complicated physical interaction. The strength of the approximation is its simplicity and versatility. Though the relationship between normal force and frictional force is not exactly linear (and so the frictional force is not entirely independent of the contact area of the surfaces), the Coulomb approximation is an adequate representation of friction for the analysis of many physical systems.

When the surfaces are conjoined, Coulomb friction becomes a very poor approximation (for example, adhesive tape resists sliding even when there is no normal force, or a negative normal force). In this case, the frictional force may depend strongly on the area of contact. Some drag racing tires are adhesive for this reason. However, despite the complexity of the fundamental physics behind friction, the relationships are accurate enough to be useful in many applications.

== Dry friction and instabilities ==
Dry friction can induce several types of instabilities in mechanical systems which display a stable behaviour in the absence of friction. These instabilities may be caused by the decrease of the friction force with an increasing velocity of sliding, by material expansion due to heat generation during friction (the thermo-elastic instabilities), or by pure dynamic effects of sliding of two elastic materials (the Adams–Martins instabilities). The latter were originally discovered in 1995 by George G. Adams and João Arménio Correia Martins for smooth surfaces and were later found in periodic rough surfaces. In particular, friction-related dynamical instabilities are thought to be responsible for brake squeal and the 'song' of a glass harp, phenomena which involve stick and slip, modelled as a drop of friction coefficient with velocity.

A practically important case is the self-oscillation of the strings of bowed instruments such as the violin, cello, hurdy-gurdy, erhu, etc.

A connection between dry friction and flutter instability in a simple mechanical system has been discovered, watch the movie for more details. Frictional instabilities can lead to the formation of new self-organized patterns (or "secondary structures") at the sliding interface, such as in-situ formed tribofilms which are utilized for the reduction of friction and wear in so-called self-lubricating materials.

== Friction at the nanoscale ==
In 2008 scientists for the first time were able to move a single atom across a surface, and measure the forces required. Using ultrahigh vacuum and nearly zero temperature (5 K), a modified atomic force microscope was used to drag a cobalt atom, and a carbon monoxide molecule, across surfaces of copper and platinum.

As of 2012, a single study has demonstrated the potential for an effectively negative coefficient of friction in the low-load regime, meaning that a decrease in normal force leads to an increase in friction. This contradicts everyday experience in which an increase in normal force leads to an increase in friction. This was reported in the journal Nature in October 2012 and involved the friction encountered by an atomic force microscope stylus when dragged across a graphene sheet in the presence of graphene-adsorbed oxygen.

The origin of kinetic friction at nanoscale can be rationalized by an energy model. During sliding, a new surface forms at the back of a sliding true contact, and existing surface disappears at the front of it. Since all surfaces involve the thermodynamic surface energy, work must be spent in creating the new surface, and energy is released as heat in removing the surface. Thus, a force is required to move the back of the contact, and frictional heat is released at the front.

Under certain conditions some materials have very low friction coefficients. An example is (highly ordered pyrolytic) graphite which can have a friction coefficient below 0.01. This ultralow-friction regime is called superlubricity.

== Fluid friction ==
Fluid friction occurs between fluid layers that are moving relative to each other. This internal resistance to flow is named viscosity. In everyday terms, the viscosity of a fluid is described as its "thickness". Thus, water is "thin", having a lower viscosity, while honey is "thick", having a higher viscosity. The less viscous the fluid, the greater its ease of deformation or movement.

All real fluids (except superfluids) offer some resistance to shearing and therefore are viscous. For teaching and explanatory purposes it is helpful to use the concept of an inviscid fluid or an ideal fluid which offers no resistance to shearing and so is not viscous.

== Lubricated friction ==
Lubricated friction is a case of fluid friction where a fluid separates two solid surfaces. Lubrication is a technique employed to reduce wear of one or both surfaces in close proximity moving relative to each another by interposing a substance called a lubricant between the surfaces. In most cases the applied load is carried by pressure generated within the fluid due to the frictional viscous resistance to motion of the lubricating fluid between the surfaces. Adequate lubrication allows smooth continuous operation of equipment, with only mild wear, and without excessive stresses or seizures at bearings. When lubrication breaks down, metal or other components can rub destructively over each other, causing heat and possibly damage or failure.

== Skin friction ==
Skin friction arises from the interaction between the fluid and the skin of an object, and is directly related to the area of the surface of the body that is in contact with the fluid. Skin friction follows the drag equation and rises with the square of the velocity.

Skin friction is caused by viscous drag in the boundary layer around the object. There are two ways to decrease skin friction: the first is to shape the moving body so that smooth flow is possible, like an airfoil. The second method is to decrease the length and cross-section of the moving object as much as is practicable.

== Internal friction ==
Internal friction is the force resisting motion between the elements making up a solid material while it undergoes deformation. The best understood case is the drag force on dislocations due to atomic vibrations (phonon drag), although electron interactions can also play a role. There are also contributions from dissipative forces on the motion of grain boundaries in metals, and there are similar phenomena in vitreous materials such as glasses.

== Radiation friction ==
As a consequence of light pressure, Einstein in 1909 predicted the existence of "radiation friction" which would oppose the movement of matter. He wrote, "radiation will exert pressure on both sides of the plate. The forces of pressure exerted on the two sides are equal if the plate is at rest. However, if it is in motion, more radiation will be reflected on the surface that is ahead during the motion (front surface) than on the back surface. The backward-acting force of pressure exerted on the front surface is thus larger than the force of pressure acting on the back. Hence, as the resultant of the two forces, there remains a force that counteracts the motion of the plate and that increases with the velocity of the plate. We will call this resultant 'radiation friction' in brief."

== Other types of friction ==
=== Rolling resistance ===
Rolling resistance is the force that resists the rolling of a wheel or other circular object along a surface caused by deformations in the object or surface. Generally the force of rolling resistance is less than that associated with kinetic friction. Typical values for the coefficient of rolling resistance for steel wheels on a track are 0.001. One of the most common examples of rolling resistance, with a coefficient of around 0.02, is the movement of motor vehicle tires on a road, a process which generates heat and sound as by-products.

=== Braking friction ===
Any wheel equipped with a brake is capable of generating a large retarding force, usually for the purpose of slowing and stopping a vehicle or piece of rotating machinery. Braking friction differs from rolling friction because the coefficient of friction for rolling friction is small whereas the coefficient of friction for braking friction is designed to be large by choice of materials for brake pads.

=== Triboelectric effect ===
Rubbing two materials against each other can lead to charge transfer, either electrons or ions. The energy required for this contributes to the friction. In addition, sliding can cause a build-up of electrostatic charge, which can be hazardous if flammable gases or vapours are present. When the static build-up discharges, explosions can be caused by ignition of the flammable mixture. However, as discussed recently the extent to which triboelectricity contributes to friction is contentious, with some claims that it is large, others that it is small because charge transfer can occur with superlubricious samples.

=== Belt friction ===
Belt friction is a physical property observed from the forces acting on a belt wrapped around a pulley, when one end is being pulled. The resulting tension, which acts on both ends of the belt, can be modeled by the belt friction equation.

In practice, the theoretical tension acting on the belt or rope calculated by the belt friction equation can be compared to the maximum tension the belt can support. This helps a designer of such a rig to know how many times the belt or rope must be wrapped around the pulley to prevent it from slipping. Mountain climbers and sailing crews demonstrate a standard knowledge of belt friction when accomplishing basic tasks.

== Friction reduction ==
=== Devices ===
Devices such as wheels, ball bearings, roller bearings, and air cushion or other types of fluid bearings can change sliding friction into a much smaller type of rolling friction.

Many thermoplastic materials such as nylon, HDPE and PTFE are commonly used in low friction bearings. They are especially useful because the coefficient of friction falls with increasing imposed load. For improved wear resistance, very high molecular weight grades are usually specified for heavy duty or critical bearings.

=== Lubricants ===
A common way to reduce friction is by using a lubricant, such as oil, water, or grease, which is placed between the two surfaces, often dramatically lessening the coefficient of friction. The science of friction and lubrication is called tribology. Lubricant technology is when lubricants are mixed with the application of science, especially to industrial or commercial objectives.

Superlubricity, a recently discovered effect, has been observed in graphite: it is the substantial decrease of friction between two sliding objects, approaching zero levels. A very small amount of frictional energy would still be dissipated.

Lubricants to overcome friction need not always be thin, turbulent fluids or powdery solids such as graphite and talc; acoustic lubrication actually uses sound as a lubricant.

Another way to reduce friction between two parts is to superimpose micro-scale vibration to one of the parts. This can be sinusoidal vibration as used in ultrasound-assisted cutting or vibration noise, known as dither.

== Applications ==
Friction is an important factor in many engineering disciplines.

=== Transportation ===
- Automobile brakes inherently rely on friction, slowing a vehicle by converting its kinetic energy into heat. Incidentally, dispersing this large amount of heat safely is one technical challenge in designing brake systems. Disk brakes rely on friction between a disc and brake pads that are squeezed transversely against the rotating disc. In drum brakes, brake shoes or pads are pressed outwards against a rotating cylinder (brake drum) to create friction. Since braking discs can be more efficiently cooled than drums, disc brakes have better stopping performance.
- Rail adhesion refers to the grip wheels of a train have on the rails, see Frictional contact mechanics.
- Road slipperiness is an important design and safety factor for automobiles
  - Split friction is a particularly dangerous condition arising due to varying friction on either side of a car.
  - Road texture affects the interaction of tires and the driving surface.

=== Measurement ===
- A tribometer is an instrument that measures friction on a surface.
- A profilograph is a device used to measure pavement surface roughness.

=== Household usage ===
- Friction is used to heat and ignite matchsticks (friction between the head of a matchstick and the rubbing surface of the match box).
- Sticky pads are used to prevent objects from slipping off smooth surfaces by effectively increasing the friction coefficient between the surface and the object.

== See also ==
- Contact dynamics
- Contact mechanics
- Factor of adhesion
- Friction Acoustics
- Frictionless plane
- Galling
- Lateral adhesion
- Non-smooth mechanics
- Normal contact stiffness
- Stick-slip phenomenon
- Transient friction loading
- Triboelectric effect
- Unilateral contact
- Friction torque
