= Signorini =

Signorini is an Italian surname. Notable people with the surname include:

- Alfonso Signorini (born 1964), an Italian television host
- Andrea Signorini (born 1990), an Italian footballer, son of Gianluca Signorini
- Antonio Signorini (physicist) (1888-1963), an Italian mathematical physicist
- Antonio Signorini (artist) (born 1971), Italian artist active in sculpture, painting and monumental art
- Francesca Signorini (née Caccini) (1587-1641), an Italian musician
- Gaetano Signorini (1806-1872), an Italian painter
- Gianluca Signorini (1960-2002), an Italian footballer
- Giuseppe Signorini (1857-1932), an Italian painter
- Glauco Signorini (1913-1987), an Italian footballer
- Renato Signorini (1902-1966), an Italian sculptor
- Róbson Michael Signorini (born 1987), a Brazilian footballer
- Telemaco Signorini (1835-1901), an Italian artist and member of the Macchiaioli
- Veronica Signorini (born 1987), an Italian triathlete

== See also ==
- The Signorini problem, an elastostatics problem in linear elasticity
