= Antonio Signorini =

Antonio Signorini may refer to:

- Antonio Signorini (physicist)
- Antonio Signorini (artist)
