= Free boundary problem =

Type of partial differential equation

In mathematics, a free boundary problem (FB problem) is a partial differential equation to be solved for both an unknown function $u$ and an unknown domain $\Omega$. The segment $\Gamma$ of the boundary of $\Omega$ which is not known at the outset of the problem is the free boundary.

FBs arise in various mathematical models encompassing applications that ranges from physical to economical, financial and biological phenomena, where there is an extra effect of the medium. This effect is in general a qualitative change of the medium and hence an appearance of a phase transition: ice to water, liquid to crystal, buying to selling (assets), active to inactive (biology), blue to red (coloring games), disorganized to organized (self-organizing criticality). An interesting aspect of such a criticality is the so-called sandpile dynamic (or Internal DLA).

The most classical example is the melting of ice: Given a block of ice, one can solve the heat equation given appropriate initial and boundary conditions to determine its temperature. But, if in any region the temperature is greater than the melting point of ice, this domain will be occupied by liquid water instead. The boundary formed from the ice/liquid interface is controlled dynamically by the solution of the PDE.

Another famous example of a free boundary problem appearing in a different context is that of the valuation of American options. Because the timing of the exercise is not fixed, unlike for European options, the effective strike price takes the form of a free boundary that must be solved as part of the valuation process.

== Two-phase Stefan problems ==
The melting of ice is a Stefan problem for the temperature field $T$, which is formulated as follows. Consider a medium occupying a region $\Omega$ consisting of two phases, phase 1 which is present when $T > 0$ and phase 2 which is present when $T < 0$. Let the two phases have thermal diffusivities $\alpha_1$ and $\alpha_2$. For example, the thermal diffusivity of water is 1.4×10^{−7} m^{2}/s, while the diffusivity of ice is 1.335×10^{−6} m^{2}/s.

In the regions consisting solely of one phase, the temperature is determined by the heat equation: in the region $T > 0$,

$$\frac{\partial T}{\partial t} = \nabla\cdot(\alpha_1 \nabla T) + Q$$

while in the region $T < 0$,

$$\frac{\partial T}{\partial t} = \nabla\cdot (\alpha_2\nabla T) + Q.$$

This is subject to appropriate conditions on the (known) boundary of $\Omega$; $Q$ represents sources or sinks of heat.

Let $\Gamma_t$ be the surface where $T = 0$ at time $t$; this surface is the interface between the two phases. Let $\nu$ denote the unit outward normal vector to the second (solid) phase. The Stefan condition determines the evolution of the surface $\Gamma$ by giving an equation governing the velocity $V$ of the free surface in the direction $\nu$, specifically

$$LV = \alpha_1\partial_\nu T_1 - \alpha_2\partial_\nu T_2,$$

where $L$ is the latent heat of melting. By $T_1$ we mean the limit of the gradient as $x$ approaches $\Gamma_t$ from the region $T > 0$, and for $T_2$ we mean the limit of the gradient as $x$ approaches $\Gamma_t$ from the region $T < 0$.

In this problem, we know beforehand the whole region $\Omega$ but we only know the ice-liquid interface $\Gamma$ at time $t=0$. To solve the Stefan problem we not only have to solve the heat equation in each region, but we must also track the free boundary $\Gamma$.

The one-phase Stefan problem corresponds to taking either $\alpha_1$ or $\alpha_2$ to be zero; it is a special case of the two-phase problem. In the direction of greater complexity we could also consider problems with an arbitrary number of phases.

== Obstacle problems ==
Another famous free-boundary problem is the obstacle problem, which bears close connections to the classical Poisson equation. The solutions of the differential equation

$$-\nabla^2 u = f, \qquad u|_{\partial\Omega} = g$$

satisfy a variational principle, that is to say they minimize the functional

$$E[u] = \frac{1}{2}\int_\Omega|\nabla u|^2 \, \mathrm{d}x - \int_\Omega fu \, \mathrm{d}x$$

over all functions $u$ taking the value $g$ on the boundary. In the obstacle problem, we impose an additional constraint: we minimize the functional $E$ subject to the condition

$$u \le \varphi \,$$

in $\Omega$, for some given function $\varphi$.

Define the coincidence set C as the region where $u = \varphi$. Furthermore, define the non-coincidence set $N= \Omega \setminus C$ as the region where $u$ is not equal to $\varphi$, and the free boundary $\Gamma$ as the interface between the two. Then $u$ satisfies the free boundary problem

$$-\nabla^2 u = f\text{ in }N,\quad u = g$$

on the boundary of $\Omega$, and

$$u \le \varphi\text{ in }|\Omega,\quad \nabla u = \nabla\varphi\text{ on }\Gamma. \,$$

Note that the set of all functions $v$ such that $v \leq \varphi$ is convex. Where the Poisson problem corresponds to minimization of a quadratic functional over a linear subspace of functions, the free boundary problem corresponds to minimization over a convex set.

== Connection with variational inequalities ==
Many free boundary problems can profitably be viewed as variational inequalities for the sake of analysis. To illustrate this point, we first turn to the minimization of a function $F$ of $n$ real variables over a convex set $C$; the minimizer $x$ is characterized by the condition

$$\nabla F(x)\cdot(y-x) \ge 0\text{ for all }y\in C. \,$$

If $x$ is in the interior of $C$, then the gradient of $F$ must be zero; if $x$ is on the boundary of $C$, the gradient of $F$ at $x$ must be perpendicular to the boundary.

The same idea applies to the minimization of a differentiable functional $F$ on a convex subset of a Hilbert space, where the gradient is now interpreted as a variational derivative. To concretize this idea, we apply it to the obstacle problem, which can be written as

$$\int_\Omega(\nabla^2 u + f)(v - u) \, \mathrm{d}x \ge 0\text{ for all }v \le \varphi.$$

This formulation permits the definition of a weak solution: using integration by parts on the last equation gives that

$$\int_\Omega\nabla u\cdot\nabla(v-u)\mathrm{d}x \le \int_\Omega
f(v-u) \, \mathrm{d}x\text{ for all } v \le \varphi.$$

This definition only requires that $u$ have one derivative, in much the same way as the weak formulation of elliptic boundary value problems.

== Regularity of free boundaries ==
In the theory of elliptic partial differential equations, one demonstrates the existence of a weak solution of a differential equation with reasonable ease using some functional analysis arguments. However, the weak solution exhibited lies in a space of functions with fewer derivatives than one would desire; for example, for the Poisson problem, we can easily assert that there is a weak solution which is in $H^1$, but it may not have second derivatives. One then applies some calculus estimates to demonstrate that the weak solution is in fact sufficiently regular.

For free boundary problems, this task is more formidable for two reasons. For one, the solutions often exhibit discontinuous derivatives across the free boundary, while they may be analytic in any neighborhood away from it. Secondly, one must also demonstrate the regularity of the free boundary itself. For example, for the Stefan problem, the free boundary is a $C^{1/2}$ surface.

== Related problems ==
From a purely academic point of view free boundaries belong to a larger class of problems usually referred to as overdetermined problems, or as David Kinderlehrer and Guido Stampacchia addressed it in their book: The problem of matching Cauchy data. Other related FBP that can be mentioned are Pompeiu problem, Schiffer’s conjectures. See the external links below.

Another approach used to model similar problems is the Phase-field model.
