= Projected dynamical system =

Projected dynamical systems is a mathematical theory investigating the behaviour of dynamical systems where solutions are restricted to a constraint set. The discipline shares connections to and applications with both the static world of optimization and equilibrium problems and the dynamical world of ordinary differential equations. A projected dynamical system is given by the flow to the projected differential equation

$$\frac{dx(t)}{dt} = \Pi_K(x(t),-F(x(t)))$$

where K is our constraint set. Differential equations of this form are notable for having a discontinuous vector field.

== History of projected dynamical systems ==
Projected dynamical systems have evolved out of the desire to dynamically model the behaviour of nonstatic solutions in equilibrium problems over some parameter, typically take to be time. This dynamics differs from that of ordinary differential equations in that solutions are still restricted to whatever constraint set the underlying equilibrium problem was working on, e.g. nonnegativity of investments in financial modeling, convex polyhedral sets in operations research, etc. One particularly important class of equilibrium problems which has aided in the rise of projected dynamical systems has been that of variational inequalities.

The formalization of projected dynamical systems began in the 1990s in Section 5.3 of the paper of Dupuis and Ishii. However, similar concepts can be found in the mathematical literature which predate this, especially in connection with variational inequalities and differential inclusions.

== Projections and Cones ==
Any solution to our projected differential equation must remain inside of our constraint set K for all time. This desired result is achieved through the use of projection operators and two particular important classes of convex cones. Here we take K to be a closed, convex subset of some Hilbert space X.

The normal cone to the set K at the point x in K is given by

$$N_K(x) = \{ p \in V | \langle p, x - x^* \rangle \geq 0, \forall x^* \in K \}.$$

The tangent cone (or contingent cone) to the set K at the point x is given by

$$T_K(x) = \overline{\bigcup_{h>0} \frac{1}{h} (K-x)}.$$

The projection operator (or closest element mapping) of a point x in X to K is given by the point $P_K(x)$ in K such that

$$\| x-P_K(x) \| \leq \| x-y \|$$

for every y in K.

The vector projection operator of a vector v in X at a point x in K is given by

$$\Pi_K(x,v)=\lim_{\delta \to 0^+} \frac{P_K(x+\delta v)-x}{\delta}.$$

Which is just the Gateaux Derivative computed in the direction of the Vector field

== Projected Differential Equations ==
Given a closed, convex subset K of a Hilbert space X and a vector field -F which takes elements from K into X, the projected differential equation associated with K and -F is defined to be

$$\frac{dx(t)}{dt} = \Pi_K(x(t),-F(x(t))).$$

On the interior of K solutions behave as they would if the system were an unconstrained ordinary differential equation. However, since the vector field is discontinuous along the boundary of the set, projected differential equations belong to the class of discontinuous ordinary differential equations. While this makes much of ordinary differential equation theory inapplicable, it is known that when -F is a Lipschitz continuous vector field, a unique absolutely continuous solution exists through each initial point x(0)=x_{0} in K on the interval $[0,\infty)$.

This differential equation can be alternately characterized by

$$\frac{dx(t)}{dt} = P_{T_K(x(t))}(-F(x(t)))$$

or

$$\frac{dx(t)}{dt} = -F(x(t))-P_{N_K(x(t))}(-F(x(t))).$$

The convention of denoting the vector field -F with a negative sign arises from a particular connection projected dynamical systems shares with variational inequalities. The convention in the literature is to refer to the vector field as positive in the variational inequality, and negative in the corresponding projected dynamical system.

== See also ==
- Differential variational inequality
- Dynamical systems theory
- Ordinary differential equation
- Variational inequality
- Differential inclusion
- Complementarity theory
