= Xiaojun Chen =

Chinese applied mathematician

Xiaojun Chen is a Chinese applied mathematician, Chair Professor of Applied Mathematics at Hong Kong Polytechnic University. Her research interests include nonsmooth and nonconvex optimization, complementarity theory, and stochastic equilibrium problems.

== Education and career ==
Chen completed her Ph.D. in 1987 at Xi'an Jiaotong University. At Hong Kong Polytechnic University, she was head of the applied mathematics department from 2013 to 2019. Since 2020 she has directed the University Research Facility in Big Data Analytics, and co-directed the CAS AMSS-PolyU Joint Laboratory of Applied Mathematics

== Recognition ==
Chen was named a SIAM Fellow in the 2021 class of fellows, "for contributions to optimization, stochastic variational inequalities, and nonsmooth analysis". She was named to the 2023 class of Fellows of the American Mathematical Society, "for contributions to mathematical optimization, stochastic variational inequalities, and the analysis of nondifferentiable functions".
