= Obstacle problem =

Motivating example in mathematical study

The obstacle problem is a classic motivating example in the mathematical study of variational inequalities and free boundary problems. The problem is to find the equilibrium position of an elastic membrane whose boundary is held fixed, and which is constrained to lie above a given obstacle. It is deeply related to the study of minimal surfaces and the capacity of a set in potential theory as well. Applications include the study of fluid filtration in porous media, constrained heating, elasto-plasticity, optimal control, and financial mathematics.

The mathematical formulation of the problem is to seek minimizers of the Dirichlet energy functional,

$\displaystyle J = \int_D |\nabla u|^2 \mathrm{d}x$

in some domains $D$ where the functions $u$ represent the vertical displacement of the membrane. In addition to satisfying Dirichlet boundary conditions corresponding to the fixed boundary of the membrane, the functions $u$ are in addition constrained to be greater than some given obstacle function $\phi(x)$. The solution breaks down into a region where the solution is equal to the obstacle function, known as the contact set, and a region where the solution is above the obstacle. The interface between the two regions is the free boundary.

In general, the solution is continuous and possesses Lipschitz continuous first derivatives, but that the solution is generally discontinuous in the second derivatives across the free boundary. The free boundary is characterized as a Hölder continuous surface except at certain singular points, which reside on a smooth manifold.

== Historical note ==
Qualche tempo dopo Stampacchia, partendo sempre dalla sua disequazione variazionale, aperse un nuovo campo di ricerche che si rivelò importante e fecondo. Si tratta di quello che oggi è chiamato il problema dell'ostacolo.

— Sandro Faedo, (Faedo 1986, p. 107)

== Motivating problems ==
=== Shape of a membrane above an obstacle ===
The obstacle problem arises when one considers the shape taken by a soap film in a domain whose boundary position is fixed (see Plateau's problem), with the added constraint that the membrane is constrained to lie above some obstacle $\phi(x)$ in the interior of the domain as well. In this case, the energy functional to be minimized is the surface area integral, or

$\displaystyle J(u) = \int_D \sqrt{1 + |\nabla u|^2}\,\mathrm{d}x.$

This problem can be linearized in the case of small perturbations by expanding the energy functional in terms of its Taylor series and taking the first term only, in which case the energy to be minimized is the standard Dirichlet energy

$\displaystyle J(u) = \int_D |\nabla u|^2 \mathrm{d}x.$

=== Optimal stopping ===
The obstacle problem also arises in control theory, specifically the question of finding the optimal stopping time for a stochastic process with payoff function $\phi(x)$.

In the simple case wherein the process is Brownian motion, and the process is forced to stop upon exiting the domain, the solution $u(x)$ of the obstacle problem can be characterized as the expected value of the payoff, starting the process at $x$, if the optimal stopping strategy is followed. The stopping criterion is simply that one should stop upon reaching the contact set.

== Formal statement ==
Suppose the following data is given:

1. an open bounded domain $D\subseteq\mathbb{R}^n$ with smooth boundary
2. a smooth function $f$ on $\partial D$ (the boundary of $D$)
3. a smooth function $\varphi$ defined on all of $D$ such that $\varphi|_{\partial D} < f$, i.e., the restriction of $\varphi$ to the boundary of $D$ (its trace) is less than $f$.

Then consider the set

$\displaystyle K = \left\{v\in H^1(D): v|_{\partial D} = f\text{ and } v \geq \varphi \right\},$

which is a closed convex subset of the Sobolev space $H^1(D)$ of square integrable functions with domain $D$ whose weak first derivatives is square integrable, containing those functions with the desired boundary conditions and whose values above the obstacle's. A solution to the obstacle problem is a function $u\in K$ which minimizes the energy integral

$\displaystyle J(v) = \int_D |\nabla v|^2\mathrm{d}x$

over all functions $v$ belonging to $K$; in symbols

$$J(u)=\operatorname{min}_{v\in K} J(v)\text{ or }u\in\operatorname{Argmin}_K J.$$

The existence and uniqueness of such a minimizer is assured by considerations of Hilbert space theory.

== Alternative formulations ==
=== Variational inequality ===
The obstacle problem can be reformulated as a standard problem in the theory of variational inequalities on Hilbert spaces. Seeking the energy minimizer in the set $K$ of suitable functions is equivalent to seeking

$\displaystyle u \in K$ such that $\int_D{\nabla u}\cdot{\nabla (v - u)} \operatorname{d} x \geq 0\qquad\forall v \in K,$

where $\cdot:\mathbb{R}^n\times \mathbb{R}^n\to\mathbb{R}$ is the ordinary scalar product in the finite-dimensional real vector space $\mathbb{R}^n$. This is a special case of the more general form for variational inequalities on Hilbert spaces, whose solutions are functions $u$ in some closed convex subset $K$ of the overall space, such that

$\displaystyle a(u,v-u) \geq l(v-u)\qquad\forall v \in K.\,$

for coercive, real-valued, bounded bilinear forms $(v,w)\mapsto a(v,w)$ and bounded linear functionals $v\mapsto l(v)$ on $H^1(D)$.

=== Least superharmonic function ===
A variational argument shows that, away from the contact set, the solution to the obstacle problem is harmonic. A similar argument which restricts itself to variations that are positive shows that the solution is superharmonic on the contact set. Together, the two arguments imply that the solution is a superharmonic function.

In fact, an application of the maximum principle then shows that the solution to the obstacle problem is the least superharmonic function in the set of admissible functions.

== Regularity properties ==
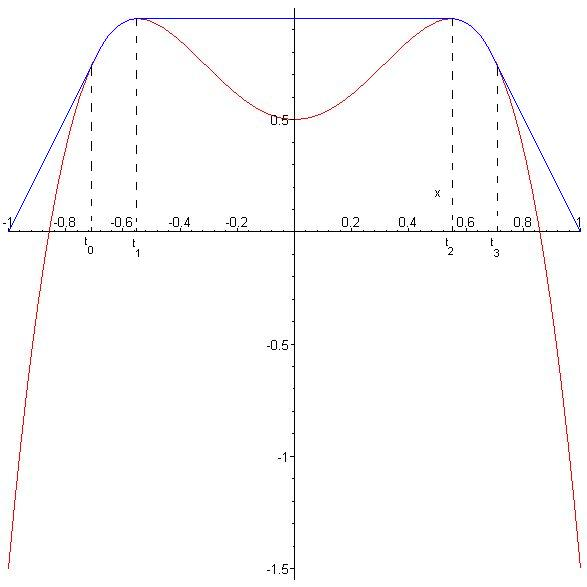
Solution of a one-dimensional obstacle problem. Notice how the solution stays superharmonic (concave down in 1-D), and matches derivatives with the obstacle (which is the $C^{1,1}$ condition)

=== Optimal regularity ===
The solution to the obstacle problem has $C^{1,1}$ regularity, or bounded second derivatives, when the obstacle itself has these properties. More precisely, the solution's modulus of continuity and the modulus of continuity for its derivative are related to those of the obstacle.

1. If the obstacle $\phi(x)$ has modulus of continuity $\sigma(r)$, that is to say that $|\phi(x) - \phi(y)|\leq \sigma(|x-y|)$, then the solution $u(x)$ has modulus of continuity given by $C\sigma(2r)$, where the constant depends only on the domain and not the obstacle.
2. If the obstacle's first derivative has modulus of continuity $\sigma(r)$, then the solution's first derivative has modulus of continuity given by $C r \sigma(2r)$, where the constant again depends only on the domain.

=== Level surfaces and the free boundary ===
Subject to a degeneracy condition, level sets of the difference between the solution and the obstacle, $\{x: u(x) -\phi(x) = t\}$ for $t > 0$ are $C^{1,\alpha}$ surfaces. The free boundary, which is the boundary of the set where the solution meets the obstacle, is also $C^{1,\alpha}$ except on a set of singular points, which are themselves either isolated or locally contained on a $C^1$ manifold.

== Generalizations ==
The theory of the obstacle problem is extended to other divergence form uniformly elliptic operators, and their associated energy functionals. It can be generalized to degenerate elliptic operators as well.

The double obstacle problem, where the function is constrained to lie above one obstacle function and below another, is also of interest.

The Signorini problem is a variant of the obstacle problem, where the energy functional is minimized subject to a constraint which only lives on a surface of one lesser dimension, which includes the boundary obstacle problem, where the constraint operates on the boundary of the domain.

The parabolic, time-dependent cases of the obstacle problem and its variants are also objects of study.

== See also ==
- Minimal surface
- Variational inequality
- Signorini problem

== Historical references ==
- Faedo, Sandro (1986), "Leonida Tonelli e la scuola matematica pisana", in Montalenti, G.; Amerio, L.; Acquaro, G.; Baiada, E.; et al. (eds.), Convegno celebrativo del centenario della nascita di Mauro Picone e Leonida Tonelli (6–9 maggio 1985), Atti dei Convegni Lincei (in Italian), vol. 77, Roma: Accademia Nazionale dei Lincei, pp. 89–109, archived from the original on 2011-02-23. "Leonida Tonelli and the Pisa mathematical school" is a survey of the work of Tonelli in Pisa and his influence on the development of the school, presented at the International congress in occasion of the celebration of the centenary of birth of Mauro Picone and Leonida Tonelli (held in Rome on May 6–9, 1985). The Author was one of his pupils and, after his death, held his chair of mathematical analysis at the University of Pisa, becoming dean of the faculty of sciences and then rector: he exerted a strong positive influence on the development of the university.
