= Elasto-capillarity =

Physical phenomenon

Elasto-capillarity is the ability of capillary force to deform an elastic material. From the viewpoint of mechanics, elastocapillarity phenomena essentially involve competition between the elastic strain energy in the bulk and the energy on the surfaces/interfaces. In the modeling of these phenomena, some challenging issues are, among others, the exact characterization of energies at the micro scale, the solution of strongly nonlinear problems of structures with large deformation and moving boundary conditions, and instability of either solid structures or droplets/films.The capillary forces are generally negligible in the analysis of macroscopic structures but often play a significant role in many phenomena at small scales.

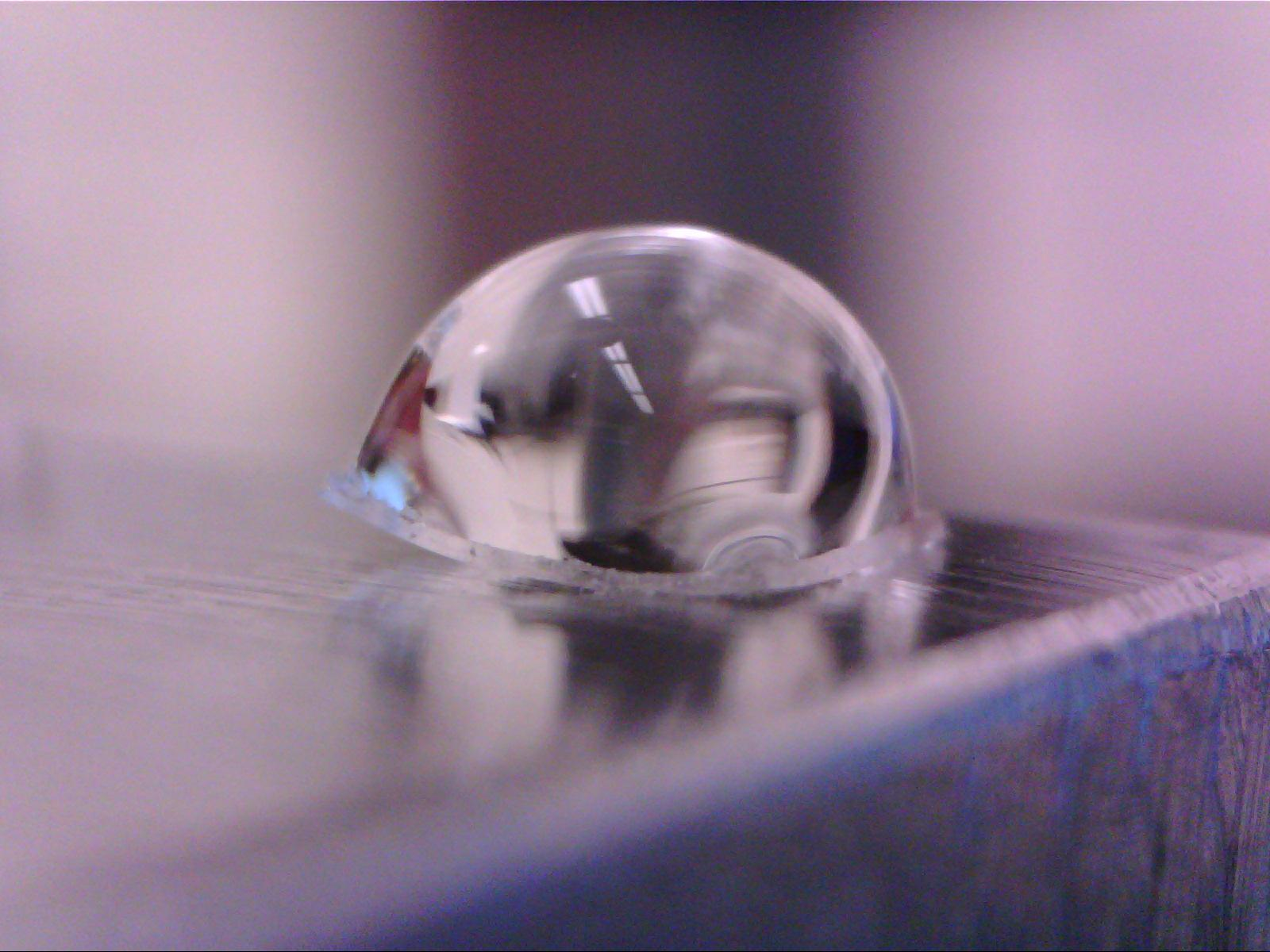
Deformation of a thin PDMS sheet by water droplet

== Bulk elasticity ==
When depositing a droplet on a solid surface with contact angle θ, horizontal force balance is described by Young's equation. However, there is a vertical force balance which while often ignored can be written as: $F_{vertical}=\gamma \times \sin(\theta) = E \times \delta$

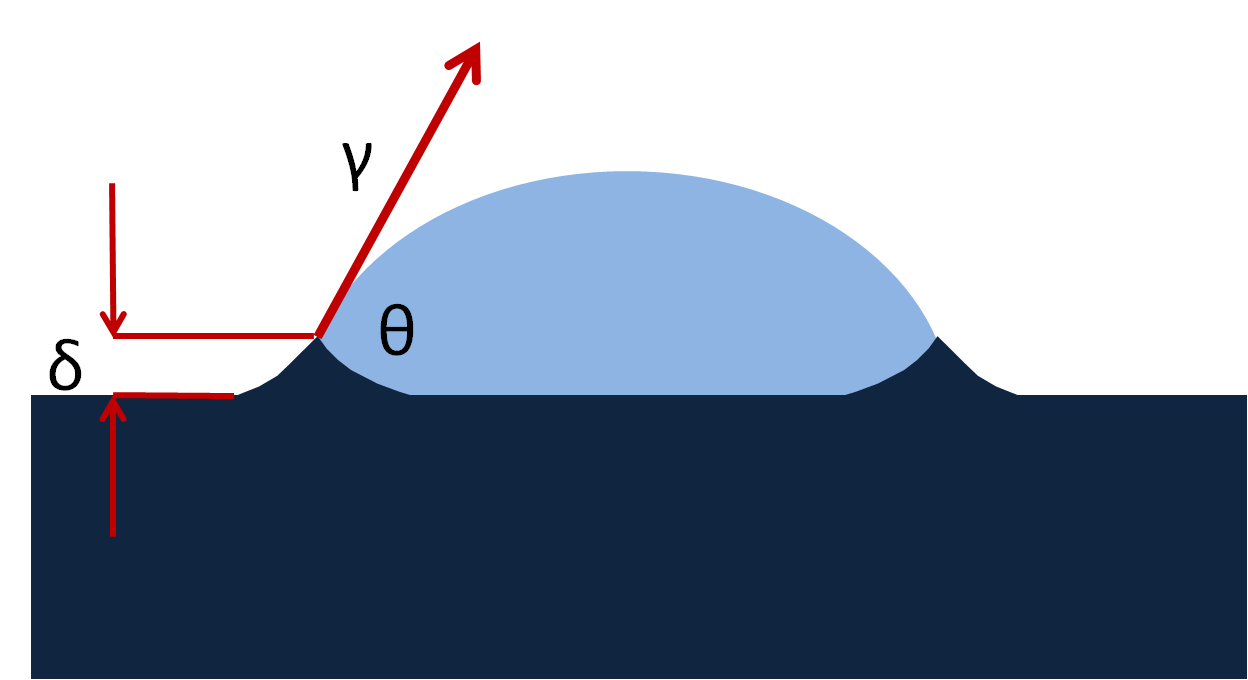
Force balance between a droplet and a substrate in the vertical direction

Where

$F_{vertical}$ is the force per unit length in the vertical direction

$\gamma$ is the surface tension of a liquid

$E$ is the Young's modulus of a substrate

$\delta$ is deformation of the substrate

This gives length scale $\delta \sim \gamma\sin(\theta) / E$ for the deformation of bulk materials caused by the surface tension force.

For example, if a water ($\gamma$ ~ 72 mN/m) droplet is deposited on the glass ($E$ ~ 700 GPa), this gives $\delta$ ~10^{−12}m which is typically negligible. However, if a water droplet is deposited on the PDMS ($E$ ~ 300 kPa), this causes the deformation to be $\delta$ ~10^{−6}m, which is in micron scale. This can have great impact on micro/nanotechnology applications where length scale is comparable and "soft" photoresists are used.

== Bendocapillary length ==
The bendo-capillary length of a flexible sheet is defined as:

$L_{EC} = (\frac{B}{\gamma})^\frac{1}{2}$

where

B is the bending modulus of an elastic material.

γ is the surface tension of a liquid.

This provides a comparison between bending stiffness (elasticity) and surface tension (capillarity). An elastic structure will be significantly deformed once its length is larger than the elasto-capillary length, which can be explained when gain of surface energy of a material is larger than stored elastic energy while bending.

== Capillary rise between parallel plates ==
In the case of capillary rise between two parallel plates, height of capillary rise can be predicted as Jurin's height if plates are rigid. Longer the plates, more flexible they become, consequently plates coalesce as a result of deformation induced by capillary force. As observed, length of capillary rise L_{wet} between elastic plates increases linearly with total length of plates L, sets length of dry L_{d}=L-L_{wet} nearly a constant. By balancing gain of surface energy by capillary force and loss of elastic energy by banding a flexible sheet and minimizing with respect to L_{d}, dry length was found to be:

$L_d^4 = \frac{9}{2}w^2 L_{EC}^2$

Where

$L_{EC} = (\frac{B}{\gamma})^\frac{1}{2}$ is the elastocapillary length of sheets

w is the distance between two parallel sheets

This L_{d} sets the minimum length for parallel sheets to collapse, sheets spontaneously coalesce if they are longer than L_{d}.

Above result can be generalized to multiple parallel plates when N elastic plates were used. By assuming these N sheets is N times more rigid than single sheet, such system can be treated as two bundles of N/2 sheets with a distance Nw/2. Thus the dry length can be written as:

$L_d^4 = \frac{9}{16} N^{3}w^{2}L_{EC}^2$

== Capillary origami ==
Capillary origami of a thin PDMS sheet using a water droplet

Unlike normal origami, capillary origami is the phenomenon where folding of an elastic sheet is done by capillary force. This phenomenon can only be seen as characteristic length of an elastic sheet is longer than elasto-capillary length and can be used in the application of self-assembly in micro and nano applications. In some cases, high voltage was used to actuate a folded structure by using electrostatic energies.

== Young–Laplace Equation ==
The capillary pressure developed within a liquid droplet/film can be calculated using the Young–Laplace equation (e.g.):

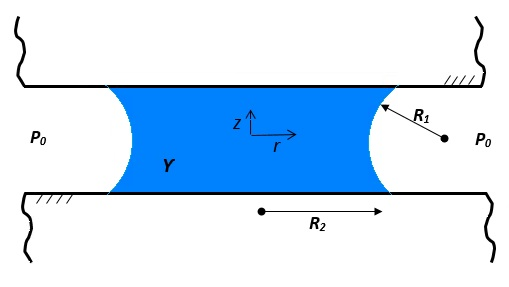
A wetting capillary droplet between two surfaces

$$\Delta p = -\gamma \nabla \cdot \hat n =\gamma (\cfrac{1}{R_1} + \cfrac{1}{R_2})$$

where:

- $\Delta p$ is the difference between the pressure across the liquid interface (Pa),
- $\gamma$ is the surface tension of the liquid (N/m),
- $\hat n$ is the unit normal pointing out of surface,
- $R_1,R_2$ are the principle radii of curvature at any point on the free surface of the liquid film or droplet (m).

If the liquid wets the contacting surfaces then this pressure difference is negative i.e. the pressure inside liquid is less than the ambient pressure, and if the liquid doesn't wet the contacting surfaces then the pressure difference is positive and liquid pressure is higher than the ambient pressure.

== Examples of elastocapillarity ==
The coalescence happens in a brush after removing it from water is an example of elastocapillarity. Elastocapillary wrapping driven by drop impact is another example. Most of the small scale devices such as microelectromechanical systems (MEMS), magnetic head-disk interface (HDI), and the tip of atomic force microscopy (AFM) for which liquids are present in confined regions during fabrication or during operation can experience elastocapillary phenomena. In these devices, where the spacing between solid structures is small, intermolecular interactions become significant. The liquid can exist in these small scale devices due to contamination, condensation or lubrication. The liquid present in these devices can increase the adhesive forces drastically and cause device failure.

== Elastocapillarity in contact between rough surfaces ==
Every surface though appears smooth at macro scale has roughness in micro scales which can be measured by a profilometer. The wetting liquid between contacting rough surfaces develops a sub-ambient pressure inside itself, which forces the surfaces toward more intimate contact. Since the pressure drop across the liquid is proportional to the curvature at the free surface and this curvature, in turn, is approximately inversely proportional to the local spacing, the thinner the liquid bridge, the greater is the pull effect.

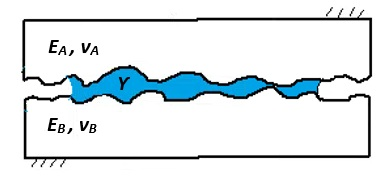
The liquid droplet with known surface tension between two rough surfaces with known material properties

$$\Delta p = -\gamma (\cos \theta_A+ \cos \theta_B)/h_{fs}$$

where:

- $\theta_A,\theta_B$ are the liquid-solid contact angles for the lower and upper surfaces, respectively,
- $h_{fs}$ is the gap between the two solids at the location of the free surface of the liquid.

These tensile stresses put the two surfaces into more contact while the compressive stresses due to the elastic deformation of the surfaces tend to resist them. Two scenarios could happen in this case: 1. The tensile and compressive stresses come into balance which in this case the gap between the two surfaces is in the order of Surface roughness|roughness of the surfaces, or, 2. The tensile stresses overcome the compressive stresses and the two surfaces come into near complete contact in which gap between surfaces is a small fraction of the surface roughness. The latter case is the reason for failure of most microscale devices. An estimate of the tensile stresses exerted by the capillary film can be obtained by dividing the adhesion force, $P_{liq}$, between two surfaces to the area wetted by the liquid film, $A_{wet}$. Because for relative smooth surfaces, the magnitude of the capillary pressure is predicted to be large, it is anticipated that the capillary pressures will be of large magnitude. A lot of works have been done to ascertain whether there may be some practical limit to the development of such negative pressures (e.g. ).
