= Variational inequality =

Type of mathematical inequality

In mathematics, a variational inequality is an inequality involving a functional, which has to be solved for all possible values of a given variable, belonging usually to a convex set. The mathematical theory of variational inequalities was initially developed to deal with equilibrium problems, precisely the Signorini problem: in that model problem, the functional involved was obtained as the first variation of the involved potential energy. Therefore, it has a variational origin, recalled by the name of the general abstract problem. The applicability of the theory has since been expanded to include problems from economics, finance, optimization and game theory.

== History ==
The first problem involving a variational inequality was the Signorini problem, posed by Antonio Signorini in 1959 and solved by Gaetano Fichera in 1963, according to the references (Antman 1983, pp. 282–284) and (Fichera 1995): the first papers of the theory were (Fichera 1963) and (Fichera 1964a), (Fichera 1964b). Later on, Guido Stampacchia proved his generalization to the Lax–Milgram theorem in (Stampacchia 1964) in order to study the regularity problem for partial differential equations and coined the name "variational inequality" for all the problems involving inequalities of this kind. Georges Duvaut encouraged his graduate students to study and expand on Fichera's work, after attending a conference in Brixen on 1965 where Fichera presented his study of the Signorini problem, as Antman 1983, p. 283 reports: thus the theory become widely known throughout France. Also in 1965, Stampacchia and Jacques-Louis Lions extended earlier results of (Stampacchia 1964), announcing them in the paper (Lions & Stampacchia 1965): full proofs of their results appeared later in the paper (Lions & Stampacchia 1967).

== Definition ==
Following Antman (1983, p. 283), the definition of a variational inequality is the following one.

Definition 1. Given a Banach space $\boldsymbol{E}$, a subset $\boldsymbol{K}$ of $\boldsymbol{E}$, and a functional $F\colon \boldsymbol{K}\to \boldsymbol{E}^{\ast}$ from $\boldsymbol{K}$ to the dual space $\boldsymbol{E}^{\ast}$ of the space $\boldsymbol{E}$, the variational inequality problem is the problem of solving for the variable $x$ belonging to $\boldsymbol{K}$ the following inequality:

$$\langle F(x), y-x \rangle \geq 0\qquad\forall y \in \boldsymbol{K}$$

where $\langle\cdot,\cdot\rangle\colon \boldsymbol{E}^{\ast}\times\boldsymbol{E}\to \mathbb{R}$ is the duality pairing.

In general, the variational inequality problem can be formulated on any finite – or infinite-dimensional Banach space. The three obvious steps in the study of the problem are the following ones:

1. Prove the existence of a solution: this step implies the mathematical correctness of the problem, showing that there is at least a solution.
2. Prove the uniqueness of the given solution: this step implies the physical correctness of the problem, showing that the solution can be used to represent a physical phenomenon. It is a particularly important step since most of the problems modeled by variational inequalities are of physical origin.
3. Find the solution or prove its regularity.

== Examples ==
=== The problem of finding the minimal value of a real-valued function of real variable ===
This is a standard example problem, reported by Antman (1983, p. 283): consider the problem of finding the minimal value of a differentiable function $f$ over a closed interval $I = [a,b]$. Let $x^{\ast}$ be a point in $I$ where the minimum occurs. Three cases can occur:

1. if $a<x^{\ast}< b,$ then $f^{\prime}(x^{\ast}) = 0;$
2. if $x^{\ast}=a,$ then $f^{\prime}(x^{\ast}) \ge 0;$
3. if $x^{\ast}=b,$ then $f^{\prime}(x^{\ast}) \le 0.$

These necessary conditions can be summarized as the problem of finding $x^{\ast}\in I$ such that

$f^{\prime}(x^{\ast})(y-x^{\ast}) \geq 0\quad$ for $\quad\forall y \in I.$

The absolute minimum must be searched between the solutions (if more than one) of the preceding inequality: note that the solution is a real number, therefore this is a finite dimensional variational inequality.

=== The general finite-dimensional variational inequality ===
A formulation of the general problem in $\mathbb{R}^n$ is the following: given a subset $K$ of $\mathbb{R}^{n}$ and a mapping $F\colon K\to\mathbb{R}$, the finite-dimensional variational inequality problem associated with $K$ consist of finding a $n$-dimensional vector $x$ belonging to $K$ such that

$$\langle \nabla F(x), y-x \rangle \geq 0\qquad\forall y \in K$$

where $\langle\cdot,\cdot\rangle\colon\mathbb{R}^{n}\times\mathbb{R}^{n}\to\mathbb{R}$ is the standard inner product on the vector space $\mathbb{R}^{n}$.

=== The variational inequality for the Signorini problem ===
The classical Signorini problem: what will be the equilibrium configuration of the orange spherically shaped elastic body resting on the blue rigid frictionless plane?

In the historical survey (Fichera 1995), Gaetano Fichera describes the genesis of his solution to the Signorini problem: the problem consist in finding the elastic equilibrium configuration $\boldsymbol{u}(\boldsymbol{x}) =\left(u_1(\boldsymbol{x}),u_2(\boldsymbol{x}),u_3(\boldsymbol{x})\right)$ of an anisotropic non-homogeneous elastic body that lies in a subset $A$ of the three-dimensional euclidean space whose boundary is $\partial A$, resting on a rigid frictionless surface and subject only to its mass forces. The solution $u$ of the problem exists and is unique (under precise assumptions) in the set of admissible displacements $\mathcal{U}_\Sigma$ i.e. the set of displacement vectors satisfying the system of ambiguous boundary conditions if and only if

$$B(\boldsymbol{u},\boldsymbol{v} - \boldsymbol{u}) - F(\boldsymbol{v} - \boldsymbol{u}) \geq 0 \qquad \forall \boldsymbol{v} \in \mathcal{U}_\Sigma$$

where $B(\boldsymbol{u},\boldsymbol{v})$ and $F(\boldsymbol{v})$ are the following functionals, written using the Einstein notation

$B(\boldsymbol{u},\boldsymbol{v}) = -\int_A \sigma_{ik}(\boldsymbol{u})\varepsilon_{ik}(\boldsymbol{v})\,\mathrm{d}x$, $F(\boldsymbol{v}) = \int_A v_i f_i\,\mathrm{d}x + \int_{\partial A\setminus\Sigma}\!\!\!\!\! v_i g_i \,\mathrm{d}\sigma$, $\boldsymbol{u},\boldsymbol{v} \in \mathcal{U}_\Sigma$

where, for all $\boldsymbol{x}\in A$,

- $\Sigma$ is the contact surface (or more generally a contact set),
- $\boldsymbol{f}(\boldsymbol{x}) = \left( f_1(\boldsymbol{x}), f_2(\boldsymbol{x}), f_3(\boldsymbol{x}) \right)$ is the body force applied to the body,
- $\boldsymbol{g}(\boldsymbol{x})=\left(g_1(\boldsymbol{x}),g_2(\boldsymbol{x}),g_3(\boldsymbol{x})\right)$ is the surface force applied to $\partial A\!\setminus\!\Sigma$,
- $\boldsymbol{\varepsilon}=\boldsymbol{\varepsilon}(\boldsymbol{u})=\left(\varepsilon_{ik}(\boldsymbol{u})\right)=\left(\frac{1}{2} \left( \frac{\partial u_i}{\partial x_k} + \frac{\partial u_k}{\partial x_i} \right)\right)$ is the infinitesimal strain tensor,
- $\boldsymbol{\sigma}=\left(\sigma_{ik}\right)$ is the Cauchy stress tensor, defined as

$$\sigma_{ik}= - \frac{\partial W}{\partial \varepsilon_{ik}} \qquad\forall i,k=1,2,3$$

where $W(\boldsymbol{\varepsilon})=a_{ikjh}(\boldsymbol{x})\varepsilon_{ik}\varepsilon_{jh}$ is the elastic potential energy and $\boldsymbol{a}(\boldsymbol{x})=\left(a_{ikjh}(\boldsymbol{x})\right)$ is the elasticity tensor.

== See also ==
- Complementarity theory
- Differential variational inequality
- Extended Mathematical Programming for Equilibrium Problems
- Mathematical programming with equilibrium constraints
- Obstacle problem
- Projected dynamical system
- Signorini problem
- Unilateral contact
