= Piero Giorgio Bordoni =

Italian physicist (1915–2009)

Piero Giorgio Bordoni (Rome, 18 July 1915 – 19 September 2009) was an Italian physicist, who first measured the anelastic relaxation effect (dissipation of elastic energy and softening of the elastic modulus), named after him, due to the stress induced motion of dislocations in metals. That experiment, together with a similar one by T.S. Kê, opened the way to the study of the dynamics of dislocations in solids. Those were also the first experiments of anelasticity in solids, a branch of physics studying defects, excitations and phase transitions in condensed matter, first systematised by Clarence Zener.

== Life ==
He received the Degree in Electrotechnical Engineering at the Sapienza University of Rome in 1937, following the steps of his father, Ugo Bordoni, Engineering Professor in the same Faculty (after whom the Fondazione Ugo Bordoni was named in Italy, established in 1952 for supporting research and applications of telecommunications).

His interest in acoustics was first aroused, still a student in 1936, by the invitation to join the newly founded Institute of Ultracoustics (later of Electroacoustics and then of Acoustics) of Consiglio Nazionale delle Ricerche (CNR), then directed by Orso Mario Corbino.

During the Second World War, he was initially in the Aeronautics and head of the Laboratory of Electroacoustics in Guidonia, where he worked at acoustically triggered torpedoes for the Navy.

In 1944 he became researcher of the Institute of Ultracoustics.

In 1947/8 he obtained a fellowship from CNR to stay 8 months at the Massachusetts Institute of Technology of Boston for studying the acoustic properties of lead down to liquid helium temperatures in the laboratory of John C. Slater, and discovered the anelastic effect due to dislocations, later named "Bordoni relaxation" or "Bordoni peak".

In 1949 he became assistant professor of Rational Mechanics at the Engineering Faculty of the Sapienza University of Rome and left the Institute of Acoustics. In 1954 became Professor of Mathematical Physics at the University of Pisa, where he remained until 1962, when he passed to the Faculty of Engineering of the University of Rome. He taught in Rome until 1985, but also carried out experimental scientific activity on the anelasticity of metals containing dislocations and interstitial hydrogen at the Institute of Acoustics "O.M. Corbino" of CNR, until 1998.

For his scientific achievements, he received an honorary degree in physics from the University of Perugia in 1988 and the Zener Prize in 1993. He had many interests besides physics, like ancient history and languages, and wrote witty sonnets in the style of the ‘Romanesco’ poet Giuseppe Gioachino Belli, inspired by episodes at the university and in the life.

== Scientific activity ==
After an initial activity on electroacoustic transducers, he started measuring the complex dynamic elastic modulus of metals at low temperature, so carrying out the earliest researches of anelasticity in solids. During a stay in 1948 in the laboratory of John C. Slater at the Massachusetts Institute of Technology of Boston, where liquid helium for reaching very low temperatures was available, he discovered an anelastic relaxation process in Pb immediately recognized as due to the stress induced motion of dislocations. That type of relaxation, due to the motion of dislocations without the participation of mobile point defects, is known as "Bordoni relaxation"’ or "Bordoni peak", since it appears as a peak in the elastic energy dissipation versus temperature. Bordoni pursued this type of investigations, extending it to other metals with face-centered cubic structure, like copper, silver, gold, palladium, platinum but also body-centered cubic structure, like niobium, and with anisotropic hexagonal structure, where the simple change of temperature causes plastic phenomena. Models of increasing sophistication have been developed to explain the complex phenomenology of the Bordoni relaxation, but there is not yet general consensus on the detailed microscopic mechanisms, and this is still now a field of active research.

Bordoni also contributed to developing the instrumentation for anelastic experiments on resonating samples, and to other aspects of anelasticity. In the 1980s he turned to the study of the interaction of dislocations with interstitial hydrogen, acting as a mobile point defect, and hence on reliable methods for electrolytically introducing H in the samples, controlling the occurrence of hydride precipitation.
