= Mixed complementarity problem =

Formulation in mathematical programming

Mixed Complementarity Problem (MCP) is a problem formulation in mathematical programming. Many well-known problem types are special cases of, or may be reduced to MCP. It is a generalization of nonlinear complementarity problem (NCP).

== Definition ==
The mixed complementarity problem is defined by a mapping $F(x): \mathbb{R}^n \to \mathbb{R}^n$, lower values $\ell_i \in \mathbb{R} \cup \{-\infty\}$ and upper values $u_i \in \mathbb{R}\cup\{\infty\}$, with $i \in \{1, \ldots, n\}$.

The solution of the MCP is a vector $x \in \mathbb{R}^n$ such that for each index $i \in \{1, \ldots, n\}$ one of the following alternatives holds:

- $x_i = \ell_i, \; F_i(x) \ge 0$;
- $\ell_i < x_i < u_i, \; F_i(x) = 0$;
- $x_i = u_i, \; F_i(x) \le 0$.

Another definition for MCP is: it is a variational inequality on the parallelepiped $[\ell, u]$.

== See also ==
- Complementarity theory
