= Gianluca Signorini =

Italian footballer (1960–2002)

Personal information
- Date of birth: 17 March 1960
- Place of birth: Pisa, Italy
- Date of death: 6 November 2002 (aged 42)
- Place of death: Pisa, Italy
- Height: 1.86 m (6 ft 1 in)
- Positions: Centre back; libero

Senior career*
Years	Team	Apps	(Gls)
1978–1979	Pisa	2	(0)
1979–1980	Pietrasanta	29	(1)
1980–1981	Prato	26	(0)
1981–1983	Livorno	65	(3)
1983–1984	Ternana	29	(0)
1984–1985	Cavese	29	(0)
1985–1987	Parma	70	(6)
1987–1988	Roma	29	(0)
1988–1995	Genoa	207	(5)
1995–1997	Pisa	?	(?)
Total		486	(15)

Managerial career
- 1998: Pisa (caretaker)
- * Club domestic league appearances and goals

Gianluca Signorini (17 March 1960 – 6 November 2002) was an Italian footballer, who played as a defender. He made more than 200 appearances for Genoa C.F.C.

== Career ==
Born in Pisa, Signorini started his career playing for his home team, Pisa S.C. of Serie C1, and successively for Pietrasanta, Prato, Livorno, Ternana and Cavese before joining A.C. Parma, with Arrigo Sacchi as coach. He quickly became a key player for Parma, helping the club to Serie B promotion in 1986, winning the Serie C1 title. He was successively signed by Nils Liedholm's A.S. Roma, and then to Genoa in 1988, after personal requests by coach Francesco Scoglio; during his first season with the club, he immediately helped the team to Serie A promotion by winning the 1988–89 Serie B title. In total, he played seven seasons for Genoa, all seven years as team captain; a hard defender and a fan favourite, he is remembered as one of the last (and best) Italian sweepers. In his later years at the club, he was a vital member of the Genoese "dream team" which managed to reach the semi-finals of the 1991–92 UEFA Cup, and became the first Italian team to beat Liverpool F.C. on their Anfield Road home turf; he also helped the team to a fourth-place finish during the 1990–91 Serie A season, the club's best league finish since the end of the Second World War.

He left Genoa in 1995 at the age of 35, to join his hometown club Pisa, then in Serie D, and retired two years later. He played 210 Serie A matches with 6 goals.

== Retirement and illness ==
After having ended his playing career, Signorini started a managing career working for Pisa, and serving as joint caretaker manager during their 1997–98 Serie C2 campaign, However, he soon discovered he was suffering from amyotrophic lateral sclerosis, also known as Lou Gehrig's disease, an illness that slowly forced immobility, paralyzing all his muscles. He died on 6 November 2002, in his Pisa home. In his honour, the #6 jersey, worn by Signorini during his time for the rossoblu club, was retired.

== Style of play ==
Signorini played as a sweeper and central defender, a position in which many considered him among the last of a traditional Italian style. Arrigo Sacchi, his once manager at Parma, appreciated his abilities in this role; later having AC Milan's defender and captain Franco Baresi watch the footage of Signorini play for Parma and demand that he build his game using Signorini as an example.

== Personal life ==
Signorini was married to Antonella; together they had four children. On 17 May 2009, one of Signorini's sons, Andrea, a footballer himself, made his Serie A debut with Genoa, thus continuing the legacy of his father and former rossoblu captain.

== Honours ==
=== Club ===
Parma

- Serie C1: 1985–86

Genoa

- Serie B: 1988–89

== See also ==
- Stefano Borgonovo
- Giovanni Bertini
- Pietro Anastasi
