= Andrea Signorini =

Italian footballer (born 1990)

Personal information
- Date of birth: 31 January 1990 (age 36)
- Place of birth: Genoa, Italy
- Height: 1.87 m (6 ft 1 1/2 in)
- Position: Centre-back

Team information
- Current team: Gubbio
- Number: 15

Youth career
- –2009: Genoa

Senior career*
Years	Team	Apps	(Gls)
2009–2011	Genoa	2	(0)
2009–2010	→ Alessandria (loan)	26	(3)
2010–2014	Benevento	84	(5)
2014–2015	Cittadella	4	(0)
2015–2016	Rimini	29	(0)
2016–2017	Fondi	30	(0)
2017–2018	Ternana	25	(1)
2018–2020	Catanzaro	23	(3)
2020	→ Triestina (loan)	2	(0)
2020–	Gubbio	162	(7)
- * Club domestic league appearances and goals as of 30 April 2026

Andrea Signorini (born 31 January 1990) is an Italian footballer who plays as a centre-back for Serie C Group B club Gubbio.

== Club career ==
The third of four children of late Genoa captain and fan favourite Gianluca Signorini, who died in 2002 after a long battle against amyotrophic lateral sclerosis, he moved his first footsteps with his father's previous team, becoming himself captain of the Primavera Under-19 team that won the 2008–09 Coppa Italia Primavera after defeating Roma in a two-legged final.

On 17 May 2009, only days after the triumph in the Coppa Italia Primavera, Signorini made his Serie A debut in a home game against Fiorentina. He also played in a home game against Chievo Verona, replacing Boško Janković during injury time.

In August 2009 he was sent out on loan to Lega Pro Prima Divisione side Alessandria.

He successively spent the 2010–11 again on loan in the Italian third tier, this time as part of the Benevento roster.

On 14 July 2014, he left Benevento after four seasons to join Serie B club Cittadella.

In the summer 2015 it was purchased by A.C. Rimini Calcio 1912 militant in Lega Pro.

In the season 2016–17, after the failure of A.C. Rimini 1912, he signed a contract with Unicusano Fondi Calcio.

In June 2017 he was bought by Serie B side Ternana Calcio.

On 31 January 2020 he joined Triestina on loan.

On 14 September 2020 he moved to Gubbio.
