= Antonio Signorini (physicist) =

Italian mathematician (1888–1963)

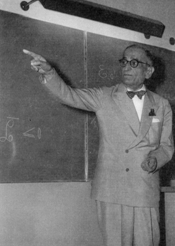
- Born: 2 April 1888; Arezzo, Italy
- Died: 23 February 1963 (aged 74); Rome, Italy
- Education: Scuola Normale Superiore (1909) (Mathematics degree); University of Palermo (1921) (Civil engineering degree)
- Known for: Signorini expansion Signorini problem
- Awards: Lavagna prize (1909); Golden medal of the Accademia Nazionale delle Scienze detta dei XL (1920)
- Scientific career
- Fields: Continuum mechanics Constitutive equations External ballistics Finite strain theory
- Workplaces: University of Palermo; University of Naples Federico II; Università di Roma
- Doctoral advisor: Gian Antonio Maggi
- Other academic advisors: Luigi Bianchi; Tullio Levi-Civita
- Doctoral students: Carlo Cattaneo; Piero Giorgio Bordoni
- Other notable students: Gaetano Fichera

Antonio Signorini (2 April 1888 – 23 February 1963) was an Italian mathematical physicist and civil engineer. He is known for his work in finite elasticity, thermoelasticity and for formulating the Signorini problem.

== Life ==
=== Honors ===
He was awarded the gold medal of the Accademia Nazionale delle Scienze detta dei XL in 1920, while he was working at the University of Palermo: the members of the judging commission were Luigi Bianchi, Guido Castelnuovo and Tullio Levi-Civita.

In 1924, on 8 June, he was elected ordinary non resident member of the mathematics division (Note: Precisely of the "Classe di Scienze Matematiche Pure e Applicate", (English translation:-"Class of Pure and Applied Mathematics"), as this division is called in Italy.) of the Accademia Pontaniana.

On 30 May 1931 he was elected corresponding member of the Società Nazionale di Scienze, Lettere e Arti in Napoli: later on, precisely on 11 February 1933 and on 4 June 1949 he was elected, respectively, ordinary member and ordinary non resident member of the same academy.

He was elected corresponding member of the Accademia Nazionale dei Lincei on July 15, 1935, and then national member on February 4, 1947. However, he was never awarded the royal prize of this academy, because he became a very early a member of it, thus losing the right to win a prize. (Note: According to Picone, who wrote what could be considered the main biographical reference on Signorini's life and work. Mauro Picone and Antonio Signorini were friends from their childhood in Arezzo: in the commemoration he wrote, Picone deals extensively with several aspects of the life and personality of Antonio Signorini.)

== Work ==
While only very few scientists between 1845 and 1945 studied the foundations of continuum mechanics, among them there were some of the most distinguished savants of the period: (...). In that period, however, many papers on the subject were published. When not essentially repetitions of earlier studies, these concerned special theories or approximations, most of which have turned later to be unnecessary in the cases when they are justified. Knowledge of the true principles of the general theory seems to have diminished except in Italy, where it was kept alive by the teaching and writing of Signorini.

— Clifford A. Truesdell and Walter Noll, (Truesdell & Noll 1965, pp. 8–9)

=== Research activity ===
His scientific production includes more than 114 works, being papers, monographs and textbooks, 17 of which have been collected in his "Opere Scelte" (Selected works).

=== Teaching activity ===
Among his "allievi" there are some of the most important Italian mathematicians and mathematical physicists; a partial list of them is below:

- Carlo Cattaneo
- Ida Cattaneo Gasparini
- Piero Giorgio Bordoni
- Giuseppe Grioli
- Giuseppe Tedone
- Carlo Tolotti

He was also a close friend and teacher of Gaetano Fichera at the Istituto Nazionale di Alta Matematica, inspiring his research in continuum mechanics, his solution of the Signorini problem and the creation of the field of variational inequalities.

== Selected publications ==
- Signorini, Antonio (1959), "Questioni di elasticità non linearizzata e semilinearizzata" [Issues in non linear and semilinear elasticity], Rendiconti di Matematica e delle sue Applicazioni, Serie 5 (in Italian), 18: 95–139, MR 0118021, Zbl 0091.38006. An important work, summarizing Signorini's approach to continuum mechanics of finite strains.
- Signorini, Antonio (1991), Opere scelte [Selected works], Florence: Edizioni Cremonese (distributed by Unione Matematica Italiana), pp. XXXI + 695. A volume collecting the most important works of Antonio Signorini with an introduction and a commentary of Giuseppe Grioli.
