= Antonio Signorini (artist) =

Italian artist

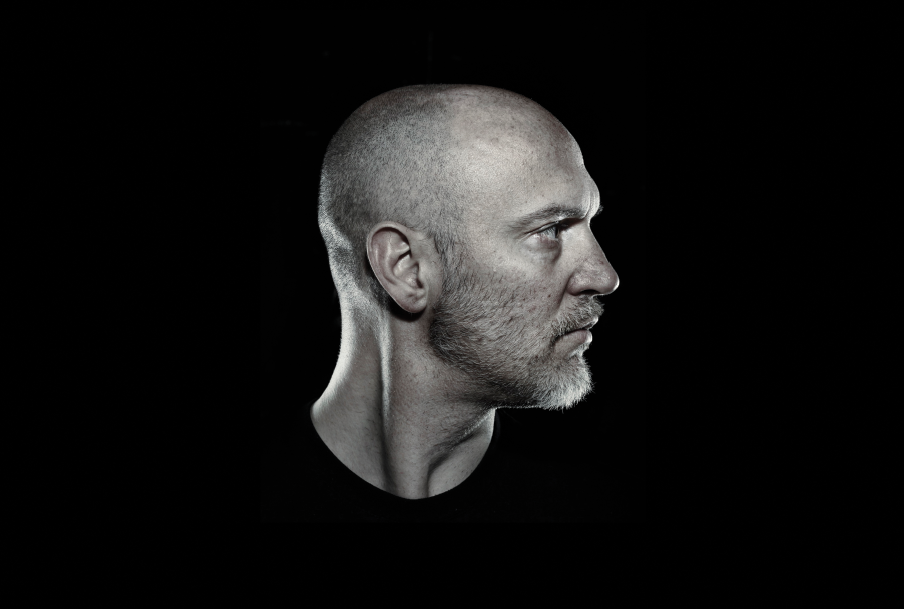
- Born: 1971 (age 54–55); Pisa, Tuscany, Italy
- Occupation: Artist
- Website: antoniosignorini.com

Antonio Signorini (born in Pisa on 26 April 1971) is a contemporary Italian artist whose work includes sculpture, painting and monumental art.

== Early life ==
Signorini was born in Pisa in 1971. He had a passion for art from a very early age and was mainly interested in Renaissance and ancient prehistoric art. Before the start of his career as an artist, he had visited museums, monuments and archaeological sites throughout Europe. This is what shaped his drawings as well as his bronze and ceramic sculptures.

== Career ==
Signorini's interest in art has followed him all his life and is not limited to one specific aspect of it. He started out by directing a production and design team in 1990 in Milan experimenting with various contemporary materials. He spent the years 2001 to 2003 in Florence, where he made bronze and ceramic sculptures using both traditional and modern techniques. He studied and investigated ancient civilizations in the prehistoric form of art.

In 2003, he moved to London where he would then live and work for the next 14 years of his life. He eventually started a historical and artistic evaluation of the city of London which lead to his interest in monumental art. Signorini developed a method of working with architectural projects - intervening at the structural stage to ensure that art was incorporated at all levels.

He now lives in Dubai working on ancient remnants of civilizations in contrast to ultra-modern architectural complexes. The Middle East allowed him to explore urban spaces both in public and private domains eventually giving his works a chance to be displayed in both domains in Middle East and Europe.

== Practice and techniques ==
Signorini has developed his own techniques and an individual approach towards the materials he uses. He has researched new bronze alloys and works with several metals and materials. Mixing fine marble powder with pigments and colours, he produces engravings and tridimensional paintings where he combined oils with acrylics with marble and fabrics.

== Works ==
=== The Warriors ===
Antonio Signorini was inspired by the cave paintings in Mesopotamia that contained a lot of figures of different people.

Signorini sketched the figures inspired by the Paleolithic paintings – in their poses with their spears. He cast them in bronze in a foundry near Florence.

These works weigh 150 kilograms each and are balanced on their feet, sometimes on toetips. He made his debut with these sculptures in 2017 in the Dubai International Financial Center (DIFC) courtyard and DIFC Gate Village. They have subsequently been exhibited throughout Europe and the Middle East and are also exhibited in Samir Kassir Square in Beirut. Additionally, they are displayed in Four Seasons lawns in Florence. The Warriors were also exhibited in Grand Canal, Venice during Architecture Biennale in 2018.

=== The Flying Horses ===
The Flying Horses were debuted by Signorini in 2018 and were exhibited in Pietrasanta in summer 2020. Made of Bronze, degraded Patina, they are four separate works of 1.25m - 1.35m in height and weigh 30 kg.

=== The Warriors of Life ===
These are a continuity of The Warriors collection, also from 2017. These are Bronze, Red Patina, 2.2m in height and weigh 90 kg.

=== DinoWish ===
DinoWish sculptures are from 2019; Bronze with 24 carrots gold leaves as covering, measuring 166 x 96 x 137 cm.

=== DNA ===
Signorini's DNA sculptures, from 2015, are metal alloy sculptures with gold finish, measuring 90 x 90 x 360 cm. Dinowish and DNA were exhibited during 2019 and 2020 in Mae sculpture Walk in Dubai organized by DIFC and 71structuralart.

== Gallery ==
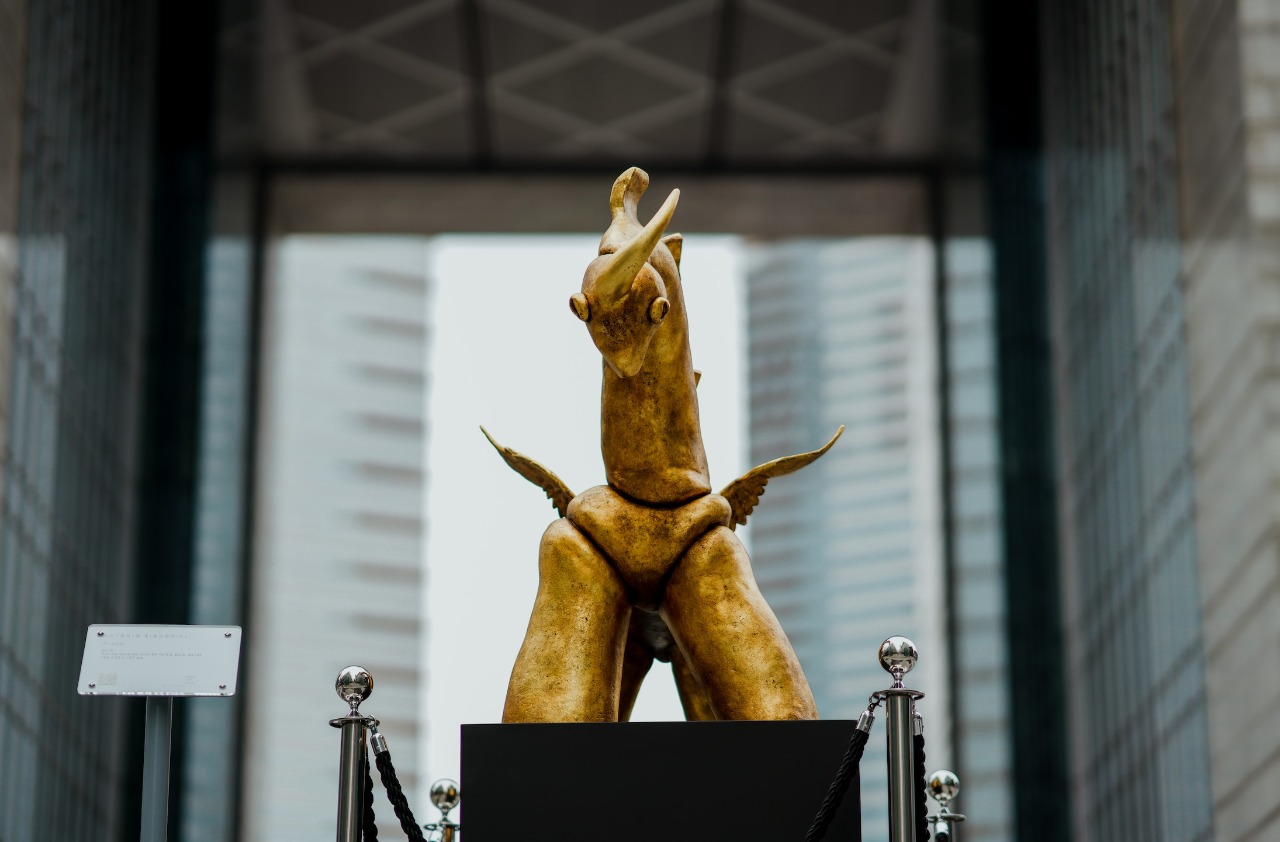
DinoWish by Antonio Signorini

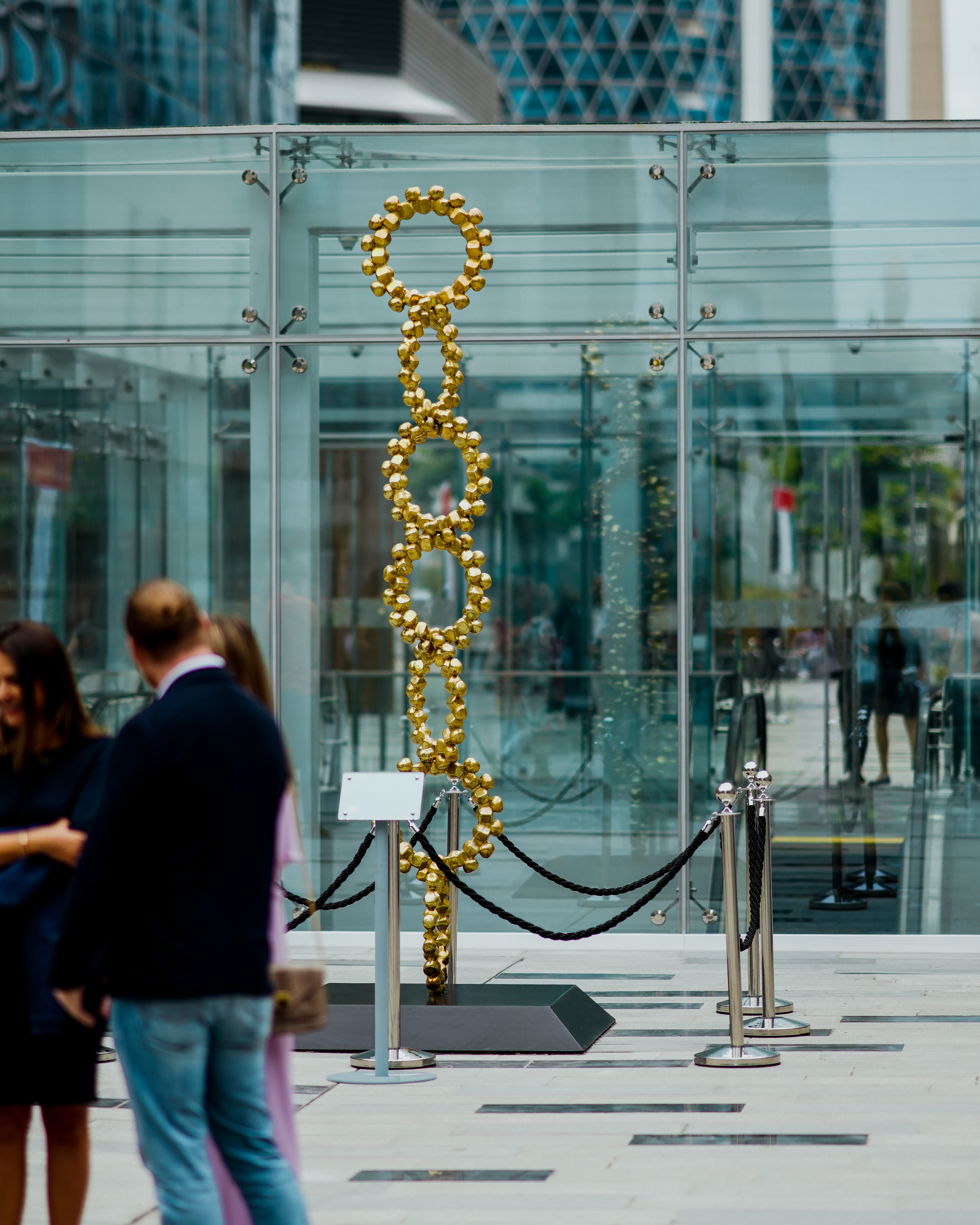
DNA by Antonio Signorini

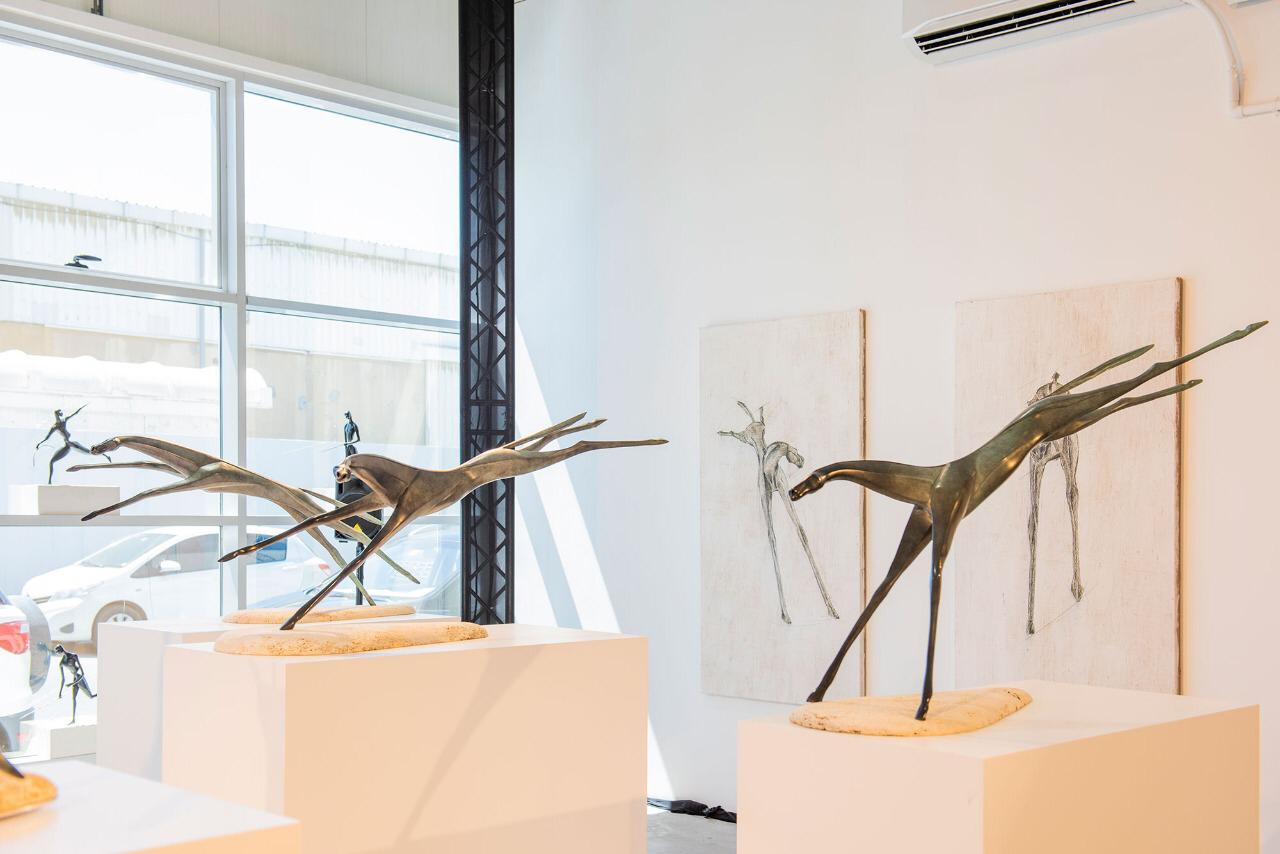
The Flying Horses by Antonio Signorini

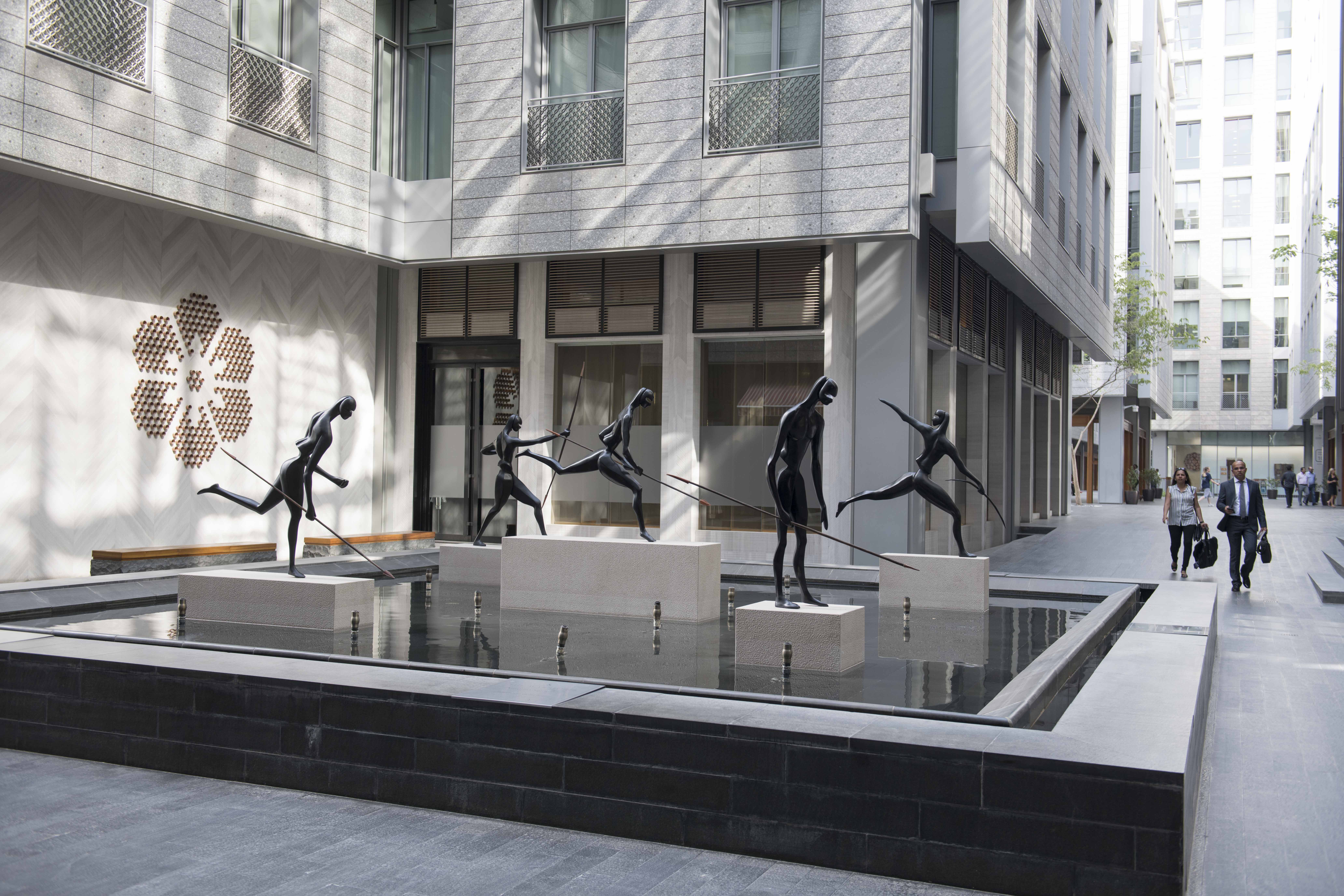
The Warriors by Antonio Signorini

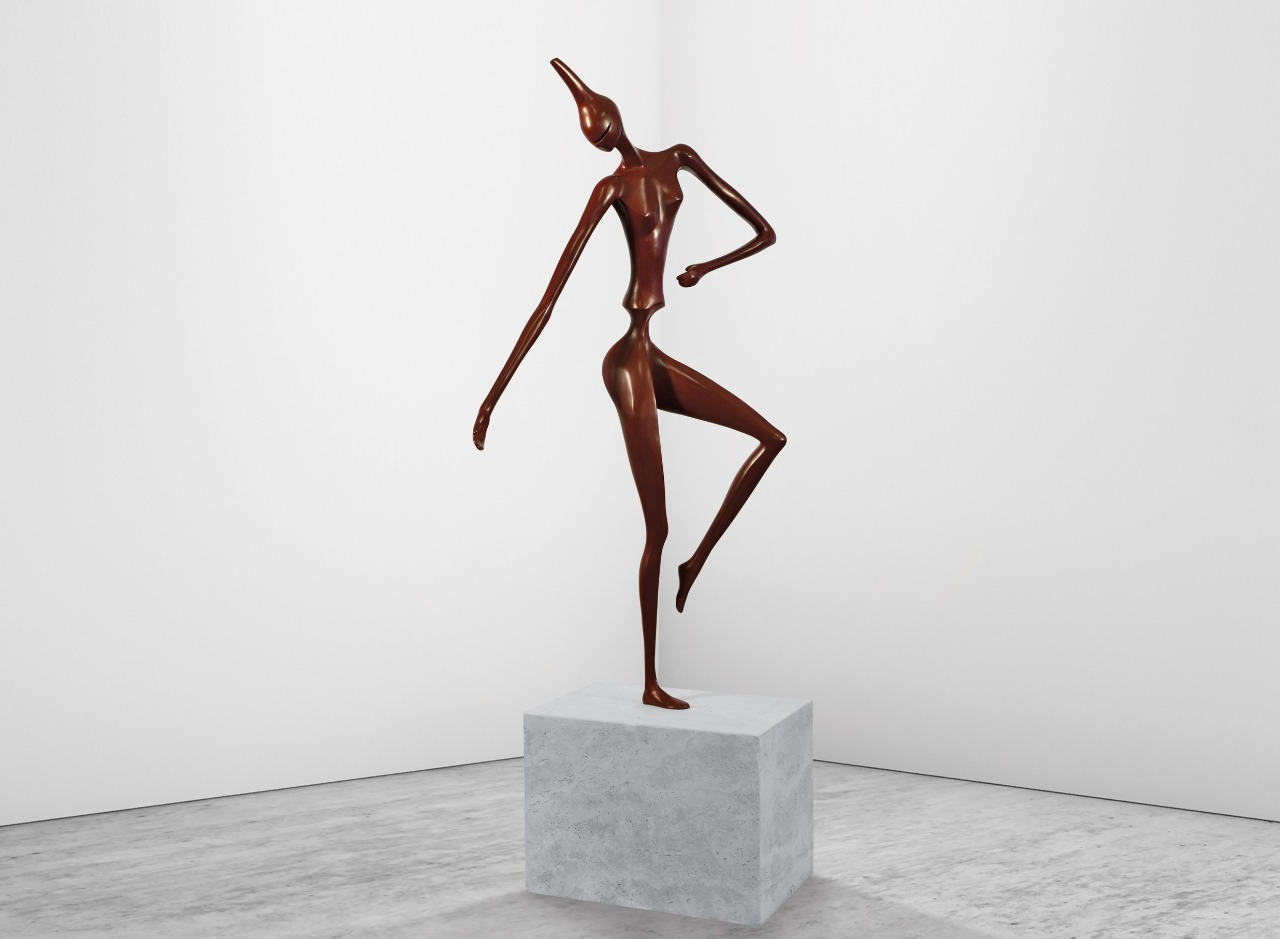
The Warriors of Life (continuity of The Warriors collection) by Antonio Signorini
