= Samir Kassir Square =

Square in Beirut, Lebanon

Completed in 2004, Samir Kassir Square is 815 square meters located in Beirut, Lebanon. Vladimir Djurovic Landscape Architecture was responsible for the design. The square acts as a gateway to Central Beirut. A raised water feature adjacent to the street physically demarcates the boundaries.
