= Mathematical programming with equilibrium constraints =

Mathematical programming with equilibrium constraints (MPEC) is the study of constrained optimization problems where the constraints include variational inequalities or complementarities. MPEC is related to the Stackelberg game.

MPEC is used in the study of engineering design, economic equilibrium, and multilevel games.

MPEC is difficult to deal with because its feasible region is not necessarily convex or even connected.
