= Elastic energy =

Form of energy

Elastic energy is the mechanical energy that is stored in the configuration of a material or physical system as it is subjected to elastic deformation by work performed upon it. Elastic energy occurs when objects are impermanently compressed, stretched or generally deformed in any manner. Elasticity theory primarily develops formalisms for the mechanics of solid bodies and materials. The elastic potential energy equation is used in calculations of positions of mechanical equilibrium. The energy is potential as it will be converted into other forms of energy, such as kinetic energy and sound energy, when the object is allowed to return to its original shape (reformation) by chemical potential energy in batteries and plasticine.

$$U = \frac 1 2 k\, \Delta x^2$$

The essence of elasticity is reversibility. Forces applied to an elastic material transfer energy into the material which, upon yielding that energy to its surroundings, can recover its original shape. However, all materials have limits to the degree of distortion they can endure without breaking or irreversibly altering their internal structure. Hence, the characterizations of solid materials include specification, usually in terms of strains, of its elastic limits. Beyond the elastic limit, a material is no longer storing all of the energy from mechanical work performed on it in the form of elastic energy.

Elastic energy of or within a substance is static energy of configuration. It corresponds to energy stored principally by changing the interatomic distances between nuclei. Thermal energy is the randomized distribution of kinetic energy within the material, resulting in statistical fluctuations of the material about the equilibrium configuration. There is some interaction, however. For example, for some solid objects, twisting, bending, and other distortions may generate thermal energy, causing the material's temperature to rise. Thermal energy in solids is often carried by internal elastic waves, called phonons. Elastic waves that are large on the scale of an isolated object usually produce macroscopic vibrations . Although elasticity is most commonly associated with the mechanics of solid bodies or materials, even the early literature on classical thermodynamics defines and uses "elasticity of a fluid" in ways compatible with the broad definition provided in the Introduction above.

Solids include complex crystalline materials with sometimes complicated behavior. By contrast, the behavior of compressible fluids, and especially gases, demonstrates the essence of elastic energy with negligible complication. The simple thermodynamic formula: $dU = -P\,dV \ ,$ where dU is an infinitesimal change in recoverable internal energy U, P is the uniform pressure (a force per unit area) applied to the material sample of interest, and dV is the infinitesimal change in volume that corresponds to the change in internal energy. The minus sign appears because dV is negative under compression by a positive applied pressure which also increases the internal energy. Upon reversal, the work that is done by a system is the negative of the change in its internal energy corresponding to the positive dV of an increasing volume. The system loses stored internal energy when doing work on its surroundings. Pressure is stress and volumetric change corresponds to changing the relative spacing of points within the material. The stress-strain-internal energy relationship of the foregoing formula is repeated in formulations for elastic energy of solid materials with complicated crystalline structure.

== Elastic potential energy in mechanical systems ==
Components of mechanical systems store elastic potential energy if they are deformed when forces are applied to the system. Energy is transferred to an object by work when an external force displaces or deforms the object. The quantity of energy transferred is the vector dot product of the force and the displacement of the object. As forces are applied to the system they are distributed internally to its component parts. While some of the energy transferred can end up stored as the kinetic energy of acquired velocity, the deformation of component objects results in stored elastic energy.

A prototypical elastic component is a coiled spring. The linear elastic performance of a spring is parametrized by a constant of proportionality, called the spring constant. This constant is usually denoted as k (see also Hooke's law) and depends on the geometry, cross-sectional area, undeformed length and nature of the material from which the coil is fashioned. Within a certain range of deformation, k remains constant and is defined as the negative ratio of displacement to the magnitude of the restoring force produced by the spring at that displacement.

$$k = - \frac{F_r}{L - L_o}$$

The deformed length, might have been the result for some L, can be larger or smaller than L_{o}, the undeformed length, so to keep k positive, F_{r} must be given as a vector component of the restoring force whose sign is negative for L>L_{o} and positive for L< L_{o}. If the displacement is abbreviated as
$$L - L_o = x ,$$
then Hooke's law can be written in the usual form
$$F_r = - k \, x.$$

Energy absorbed and held in the spring can be derived using Hooke's law to compute the restoring force as a measure of the applied force. This requires the assumption, sufficiently correct in most circumstances, that at a given moment, the magnitude of applied force.

For each infinitesimal displacement dx, the applied force is simply k x and the product of these is the infinitesimal transfer of energy into the spring dU. The total elastic energy placed into the spring from zero displacement to final length L is thus the integral
$$U = \int_0^{L-L_o} k \, x \, dx = \tfrac{1}{2} k (L-L_o)^2$$

For a material of Young's modulus, Y (same as modulus of elasticity λ), cross sectional area, A_{0}, initial length, l_{0}, which is stretched by a length, $\Delta l$:
$$U_e = \int \frac{Y A_0 \Delta l} {l_0} \, d\left(\Delta l\right) = \frac {Y A_0 {\Delta l}^2} {2 l_0}$$
where U_{e} is the elastic potential energy.

The elastic potential energy per unit volume is given by:
$$\frac{U_e} {A_0 l_0} = \frac {Y {\Delta l}^2} {2 l_0^2} = \frac {1} {2} Y {\varepsilon}^2$$
where $\varepsilon = \frac {\Delta l} {l_0}$ is the strain in the material.

In the general case, elastic energy is given by the free energy per unit of volume f as a function of the strain tensor components ε_{ij}
$$f(\varepsilon_{ij}) = \frac{1}{2} \lambda \varepsilon_{ii}^2 + \mu \varepsilon_{ij}^2$$
where λ and μ are the Lamé elastic coefficients and we use Einstein summation convention. Noting the thermodynamic connection between stress tensor components and strain tensor components,
$$\sigma_{ij} = \left ( \frac{\partial f}{\partial \varepsilon_{ij}} \right)_T ,$$
where the subscript T denotes that temperature is held constant, then we find that if Hooke's law is valid, we can write the elastic energy density as
$$f = \frac{1}{2} \varepsilon_{ij} \sigma_{ij}.$$

== Continuum systems ==
Matter in bulk can be distorted in many different ways: stretching, shearing, bending, twisting, etc. Each kind of distortion contributes to the elastic energy of a deformed material. In orthogonal coordinates, the elastic energy per unit volume due to strain is thus a sum of contributions:
$$U = \frac{1}{2} C_{ijkl} \varepsilon_{ij} \varepsilon_{kl},$$
where $C_{ijkl}$ is a 4th rank tensor, called the elastic tensor or stiffness tensor which is a generalization of the elastic moduli of mechanical systems, and $\varepsilon_{ij}$ is the strain tensor (Einstein summation notation has been used to imply summation over repeated indices). The values of $C_{ijkl}$ depend upon the crystal structure of the material: in the general case, due to symmetric nature of $\sigma$ and $\varepsilon$, the elastic tensor consists of 21 independent elastic coefficients. This number can be further reduced by the symmetry of the material: 9 for an orthorhombic crystal, 5 for an hexagonal structure, and 3 for a cubic symmetry. Finally, for an isotropic material, there are only two independent parameters, with $C_{ijkl} = \lambda \delta_{ij} \delta_{kl} + \mu \left( \delta_{ik} \delta_{jl} + \delta_{il}\delta_{jk} \right)$, where $\lambda$ and $\mu$ are the Lamé constants, and $\delta_{ij}$ is the Kronecker delta.

The strain tensor itself can be defined to reflect distortion in any way that results in invariance under total rotation, but the most common definition with regard to which elastic tensors are usually expressed defines strain as the symmetric part of the gradient of displacement with all nonlinear terms suppressed:
$$\varepsilon_{ij} = \frac{1}{2} \left( \partial_i u_j + \partial_j u_i \right)$$
where $u_i$ is the displacement at a point in the $i$-th direction and $\partial_j$ is the partial derivative in the $j$-th direction. Note that:
$$\varepsilon_{jj} = \partial_j u_j$$
where no summation is intended. Although full Einstein notation sums over raised and lowered pairs of indices, the values of elastic and strain tensor components are usually expressed with all indices lowered. Thus beware (as here) that in some contexts a repeated index does not imply a sum overvalues of that index ($j$ in this case), but merely a single component of a tensor.

== See also ==
- Clockwork
- Elasto-capillarity
- Rubber elasticity

== Sources ==
- Eshelby, J.D (November 1975). "The elastic energy-momentum tensor". Journal of Elasticity. 5 (3–4): 321–335. doi:10.1007/BF00126994. S2CID 121320629.
