= List of dimensionless quantities =

This is a list of well-known dimensionless quantities illustrating their variety of forms and applications. The tables also include pure numbers, dimensionless ratios, or dimensionless physical constants; these topics are discussed in the article.

== Biology and medicine ==
Name	Standard symbol	Definition	Field of application
Basic reproduction number	$R_0$	number of infections caused on average by an infectious individual over entire infectious period	epidemiology
Body fat percentage		total mass of fat divided by total body mass, multiplied by 100	biology
Kt/V	Kt/V		medicine (hemodialysis and peritoneal dialysis treatment; dimensionless time)
Waist–hip ratio		waist circumference divided by hip circumference	biology
Waist-to-chest ratio		waist circumference divided by chest circumference	biology
Waist-to-height ratio		waist circumference divided by height	biology

== Chemistry ==
Name	Standard symbol	Definition	Named after	Field of application
Activity coefficient	$\gamma$	$\gamma= \frac {{a}}{{x}}$		chemistry (Proportion of "active" molecules or atoms)
Arrhenius number	$\alpha$	$\alpha = \frac{E_a}{RT}$	Svante Arrhenius	chemistry (ratio of activation energy to thermal energy)
Atomic weight	M			chemistry (mass of one atom divided by the atomic mass constant, 1 Da)
Bodenstein number	Bo or Bd	$\mathrm{Bo} = vL/\mathcal{D} = \mathrm{Re}\, \mathrm{Sc}$	Max Bodenstein	chemistry (residence-time distribution; similar to the axial mass transfer Peclet number)
Damköhler numbers	Da	$\mathrm{Da} = k \tau$	Gerhard Damköhler	chemistry (reaction time scales vs. residence time)
Hatta number	Ha	$\mathrm{Ha} = \frac{N_{\mathrm{A}0}}{N_{\mathrm{A}0}^{\mathrm{phys}}}$	Shirôji Hatta (1895–1973)	chemical engineering (adsorption enhancement due to chemical reaction)
Jakob number	Ja	$\mathrm{Ja} = \frac{c_p (T_\mathrm{s} - T_\mathrm{sat}) }{\Delta H_{\mathrm{f}} }$		chemistry (ratio of sensible to latent energy absorbed during liquid-vapor phase change)
pH	$\mathrm{pH}$	$\mathrm{pH} = - \log_{10}(a_{\textrm{H}^+})$		chemistry (the measure of the acidity or basicity of an aqueous solution)
van 't Hoff factor	i	$i = 1 + \alpha (n - 1)$	Jacobus Henricus van 't Hoff	quantitative analysis (K_{f} and K_{b})
Wagner number	Wa	$\mathrm{Wa} = \frac{\kappa}{l} \frac{\mathrm{d}\eta}{\mathrm{d}i}$		electrochemistry (ratio of kinetic polarization resistance to solution ohmic resistance in an electrochemical cell)
Weaver flame speed number	Wea	$\mathrm{Wea} = \frac{w}{w_\mathrm{H}} 100$		combustion (laminar burning velocity relative to hydrogen gas)

== Physics ==
=== Solids ===
Name	Standard symbol	Definition	Named after	Field of application
Coefficient of kinetic friction	$\mu_k$			mechanics (friction of solid bodies in translational motion)
Coefficient of static friction	$\mu_s$			mechanics (friction of solid bodies at rest)
Föppl–von Kármán number	$\gamma$	$\gamma = \frac{Y r^2}{\kappa}$	August Föppl and Theodore von Kármán	virology, solid mechanics (thin-shell buckling)
Rockwell scale	–		Hugh M. (1890–1957) and Stanley P. (1886–1940) Rockwell	mechanical hardness (indentation hardness of a material)
Rolling resistance coefficient	C_{rr}	$C_{rr} = \frac{F}{N_f}$		vehicle dynamics (ratio of force needed for motion of a wheel over the normal force)

=== Optics ===
Name	Standard symbol	Definition	Named after	Field of application
Abbe number	V	$V = \frac{ n_d - 1 }{ n_F - n_C }$	Ernst Abbe	optics (dispersion in optical materials)
f-number	N	$N = \frac{f}{D}$		optics, photography (ratio of focal length to diameter of aperture)
Fresnel number	F	$\mathit{F} = \frac{a^{2}}{L \lambda}$	Augustin-Jean Fresnel	optics (slit diffraction)
Refractive index	n	$n=\frac{c}{v}$		electromagnetism, optics (speed of light in vacuum over speed of light in a material)
Transmittance	T	$T = \frac{I}{I_0}$		optics, spectroscopy (the ratio of the intensities of radiation exiting through and incident on a sample)

=== Other ===
Name	Standard symbol	Definition	Named after	Field of application
Fine-structure constant	$\alpha$	$\alpha = \frac{e^2}{4\pi\varepsilon_0 \hbar c}$		quantum electrodynamics (QED) (coupling constant characterizing the strength of the electromagnetic interaction)
Havnes parameter	$P_H$	$P_H = \frac{Z_d n_d}{n_i}$	O. Havnes	In dusty plasma physics, ratio of the total charge $Z_d$ carried by the dust particles $d$ to the charge carried by the ions $i$, with $n$ the number density of particles
Helmholtz number	$He$	$He = \frac{\omega a}{c_0} = k_0a$	Hermann von Helmholtz	The most important parameter in duct acoustics. If $\omega$ is the dimensional frequency, then $k_0$ is the corresponding free field wavenumber and $He$ is the corresponding dimensionless frequency
Lundquist number	S	$S = \frac{\mu_0LV_A}{\eta}$	Stig Lundqvist	plasma physics (ratio of a resistive time to an Alfvén wave crossing time in a plasma)
Perveance	K	${K} = \frac{{I}}{{I_0}}\,\frac{{2}}{{\beta}^3{\gamma}^3} (1-\gamma^2f_e)$		charged particle transport (measure of the strength of space charge in a charged particle beam)
Pierce parameter	$C$	$C^3=\frac{Z_c I_K}{4 V_K}$		Traveling wave tube
Beta	$\beta$	$\beta = \frac{n k_B T}{B^2/2\mu_0}$		Plasma and fusion power. Ratio of plasma thermal pressure to magnetic pressure, controlling the level of turbulence in a magnetised plasma.
Poisson's ratio	$\nu$	$\nu = -\frac{\mathrm{d}\varepsilon_\mathrm{trans}}{\mathrm{d}\varepsilon_\mathrm{axial}}$		elasticity (strain in transverse and longitudinal direction)
Q factor	Q	$Q = 2 \pi f_r \frac{\text{Energy Stored}}{\text{Power Loss}}$		physics, engineering (Damping ratio of oscillator or resonator; energy stored versus energy lost)
Relative density	RD	$RD = \frac{\rho_\mathrm{substance}}{\rho_\mathrm{reference}}$		hydrometers, material comparisons (ratio of density of a material to a reference material—usually water)
Relative permeability	$\mu_r$	$\mu_r = \frac{\mu}{\mu_0}$		magnetostatics (ratio of the permeability of a specific medium to free space)
Relative permittivity	$\varepsilon_r$	$\varepsilon_{r} = \frac{C_{x}} {C_{0}}$		electrostatics (ratio of capacitance of test capacitor with dielectric material versus vacuum)
Specific gravity	SG			(same as Relative density)
Stefan number	Ste	$\mathrm{Ste} = \frac{c_p \Delta T}{L}$	Josef Stefan	phase change, thermodynamics (ratio of sensible heat to latent heat)
Strain	$\epsilon$	$\epsilon = \cfrac{\partial{F}}{\partial{X}} - 1$		materials science, elasticity (displacement between particles in the body relative to a reference length)
Erlang	$E$	$E = \lambda h$	Agner Krarup Erlang	telephony (a measure of offered load on a telephone circuit)

== Geography, geology and geophysics ==
Name	Standard symbol	Definition	Named after	Field of application
Albedo	$\alpha$	$\alpha= (1-D) \bar \alpha(\theta_i) + D \bar{ \bar \alpha}$		climatology, astronomy (reflectivity of surfaces or bodies)
Dieterich–Ruina–Rice number	$\mathrm{R_u}$	$\mathrm{R_u} = \frac{W}{L}\frac{(b-a)\bar{\sigma}}{G}$	James H. Dieterich, Andy Ruina, and James R. Rice	mechanics, friction, rheology, geophysics (stiffness ratio for frictional contacts)
Love numbers	h, k, l		Augustus Edward Hough Love	geophysics (solidity of earth and other planets)
Porosity	$\phi$	$\phi = \frac{V_\mathrm{V}}{V_\mathrm{T}}$		geology, porous media (void fraction of the medium)
Rossby number	Ro	$\mathrm{Ro}=\frac{U}{Lf}$	Carl-Gustav Arvid Rossby	geophysics (ratio of inertial to Coriolis force)

== Sport ==
Name	Standard symbol	Definition	Field of application
Blondeau number	$B_\kappa$	$\mathrm{B_\kappa} = \frac{t_g v_f}{l_{mf}}$	sport science, team sports
Gain ratio	–		bicycling (system of representing gearing; length traveled over length pedaled)
Runs Per Wicket Ratio	RpW ratio	$\text{RpW ratio }=\frac{\text{runs scored}}{\text{wickets lost}} \div \frac{\text{runs conceded}}{\text{wickets taken}}$	cricket
Winning percentage	–	Various, e.g. $\frac{\text{Games won}}{\text{Games played}}$ or $\frac{\text{Points won}}{\text{Points contested}}$	Various sports

== Other fields ==
Name	Standard symbol	Definition	Field of application
Capacity factor		$\frac{\text{actual electrical energy output}}{\text{maximum possible electrical energy output}}$	energy
Cohesion number	Coh	$Coh=\frac{1}{\rho g}\left ( \frac{\Gamma^5}{{E^*}^2{R^*}^8} \right )^{\frac{1}{3}}$	Chemical engineering, material science, mechanics (A scale to show the energy needed for detaching two solid particles)
Cost of transport	COT	$\mathrm{COT} = \frac{E}{mgd}$	energy efficiency, economics (ratio of energy input to kinetic motion)
Damping ratio	$\zeta$	$\zeta = \frac{c}{2 \sqrt{km}}$	mechanics, electrical engineering (the level of damping in a system)
Decibel	dB		acoustics, electronics, control theory (ratio of two intensities or powers of a wave)
Elasticity (economics)	E	$E_{x,y} = \frac{\partial \ln(x)}{\partial \ln(y)} = \frac{\partial x}{\partial y}\frac{y}{x}$	economics (response of demand or supply to price changes)
Gain	–		electronics (signal output to signal input)
Load factor		$\frac{\text{average load}}{\text{peak load}}$	energy
Peel number	N_{P}	$N_\mathrm{P} = \frac{\text{Restoring force}}{\text{Adhesive force}}$	coating (adhesion of microstructures with substrate)
Pixel	px		digital imaging (smallest addressable unit)
Power factor	pf	$pf = \frac{P}{S}$	electrical (real power to apparent power)
Power number	N_{p}	$N_p = {P\over \rho n^3 d^5}$	fluid mechanics, power consumption by rotary agitators; resistance force versus inertia force)
Prater number	β	$\beta = \frac{-\Delta H_r D_{TA}^e C_{AS}}{\lambda^e T_s}$	reaction engineering (ratio of heat evolution to heat conduction within a catalyst pellet)
Relative density	RD	$RD = \frac{\rho_\mathrm{substance}}{\rho_\mathrm{reference}}$	hydrometers, material comparisons (ratio of density of a material to a reference material—usually water)
Lift Coefficient	C_{L}	$C_L = 2L/\rho v^2 A$	Aerodynamics, fluid dynamics, hydrodynamics
Drag Coefficient	C_{D}	$C_D = 2D/\rho v^2 A$	Aerodynamics, fluid dynamics, hydrodynamics

== Bibliography ==
- "ISO 80000-11:2019 Quantities and units — Part 11: Characteristic numbers". iso.org.
