= Interdigitation =

Interdigitation is the interlinking of biological components that resembles the fingers of two hands being locked together. It can be a naturally occurring or man-made state.

== Examples ==
Naturally occurring interdigitation includes skull sutures that develop during periods of brain growth, and which remain thin and straight, and later develop complex fractal interdigitations that provide interlocking strength. A layer of the retina where photoreception occurs is called the interdigitation zone. Adhesion or diffusive bonding occurs when sections of polymer chains from one surface interdigitate with those of an adjacent surface. In the dermis, dermal papillae (DP) (singular papilla, diminutive of Latin papula, 'pimple') are small, nipple-like extensions of the dermis into the epidermis, also known as interdigitations. The distal convoluted tubule (DCT), a portion of kidney nephron, can be recognized by several distinct features, including lateral membrane interdigitations with neighboring cells.

Some hypotheses contend that crown shyness, the interdigitation of canopy branches, leads to "reciprocal pruning" of adjacent trees.

Interdigitation is also found in biological research. Interdigitation fusion is a method of preparing calcium- and phosphate-loaded liposomes. Drugs inserted in the bilayer biomembrane may influence the lateral organization of the lipid membrane, with interdigitation of the membrane to fill volume voids. A similar interdigitation process involves investigating dissipative particle dynamics (DPD) simulations by adding alcohol molecules to the bilayers of double-tail lipids. Pressure-induced interdigitation is used to study hydrostatic pressure of bicellular dispersions containing anionic lipids.
