= Adhesion =

Molecular property

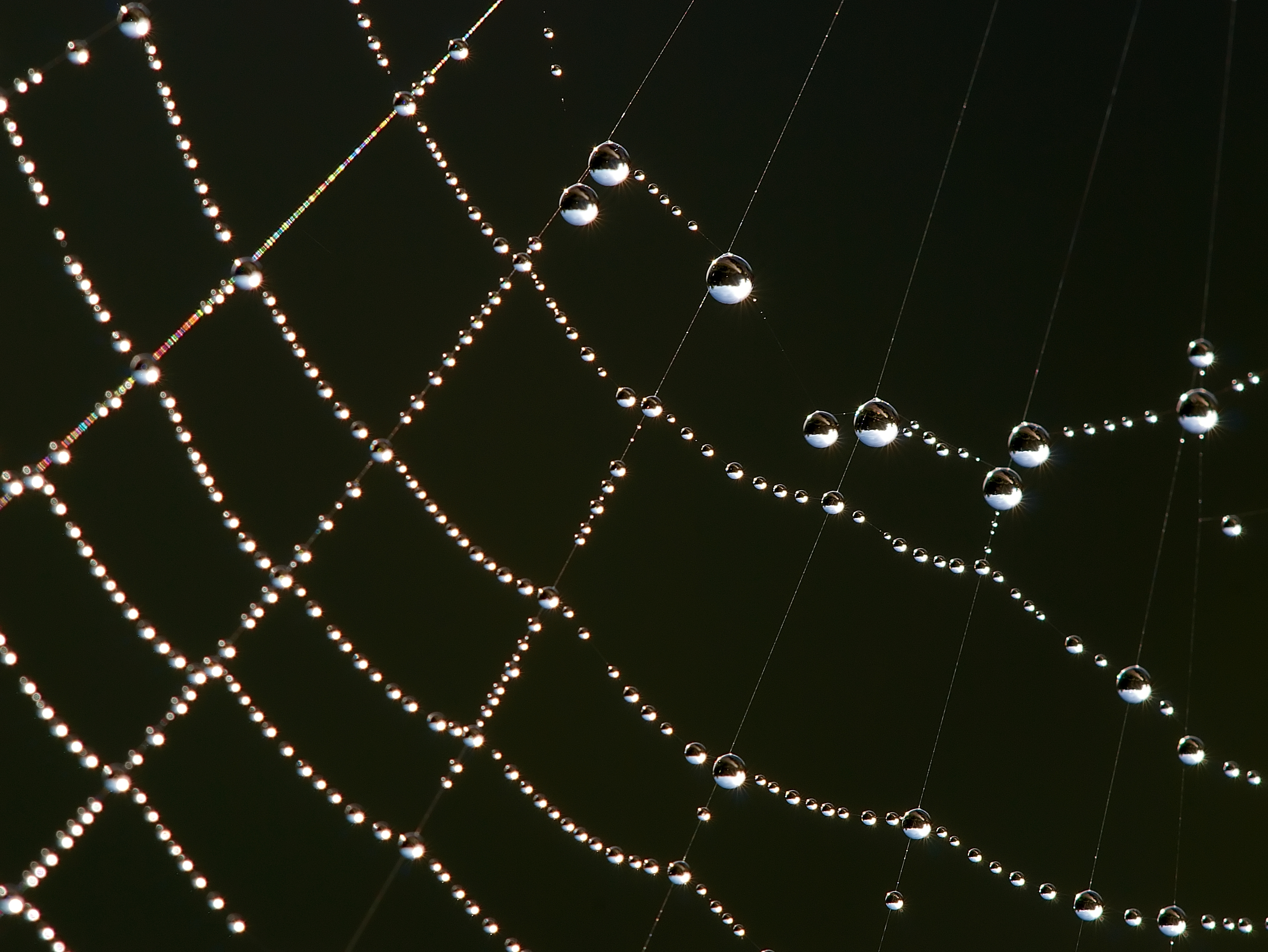
Dew drops adhering to a spider web

Adhesion of a frog on a wet vertical glass surface.

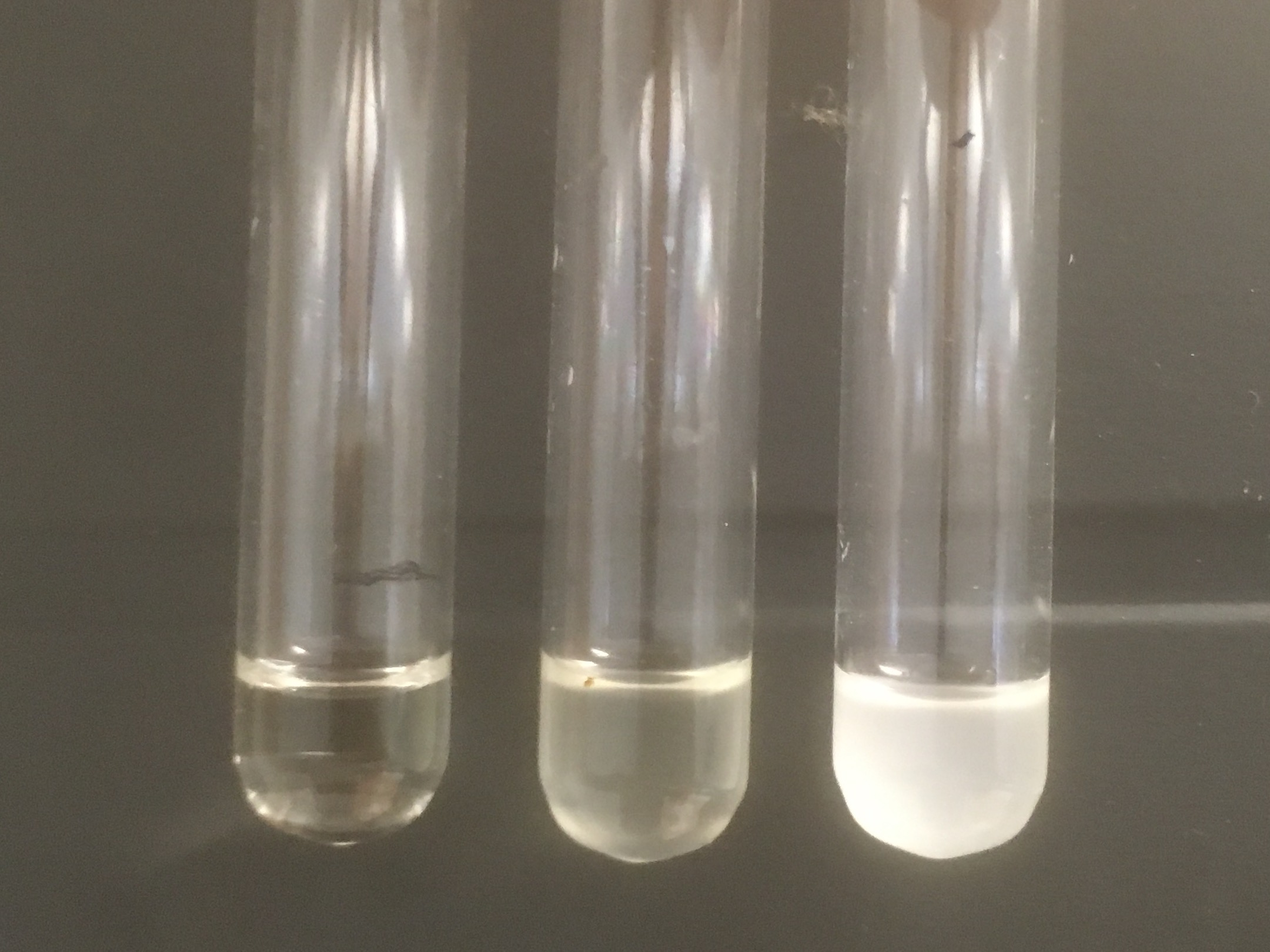
Concave meniscus is caused due to adhesion.

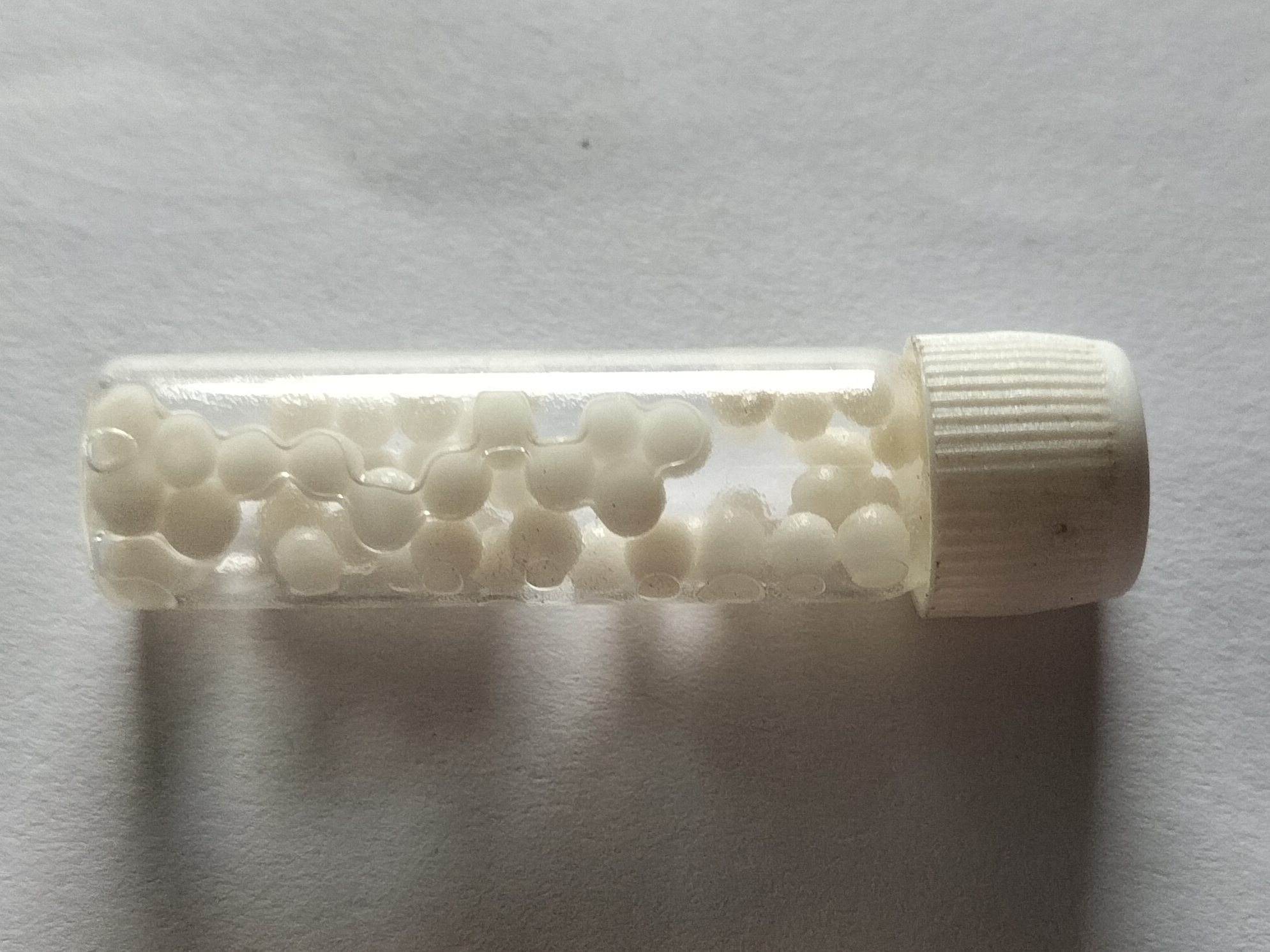

IUPAC definition

Process of attachment of a substance to the surface of another substance.

Note 1: Adhesion requires energy that can come from chemical and/or physical
linkages, the latter being reversible when enough energy is applied.

Note 2: In biology, adhesion reflects the behavior of cells shortly after contact
to the surface.

Note 3: In surgery, adhesion is used when two tissues fuse unexpectedly.

Adhesion is the tendency of dissimilar particles or surfaces to cling to one another. (Cohesion refers to the tendency of similar or identical particles and surfaces to cling to one another.)

The forces that cause adhesion and cohesion can be divided into several types. The intermolecular forces responsible for the function of various kinds of stickers and sticky tape fall into the categories of chemical adhesion, dispersive adhesion, and diffusive adhesion. In addition to the cumulative magnitudes of these intermolecular forces, there are also certain emergent mechanical effects.

== Surface energy ==
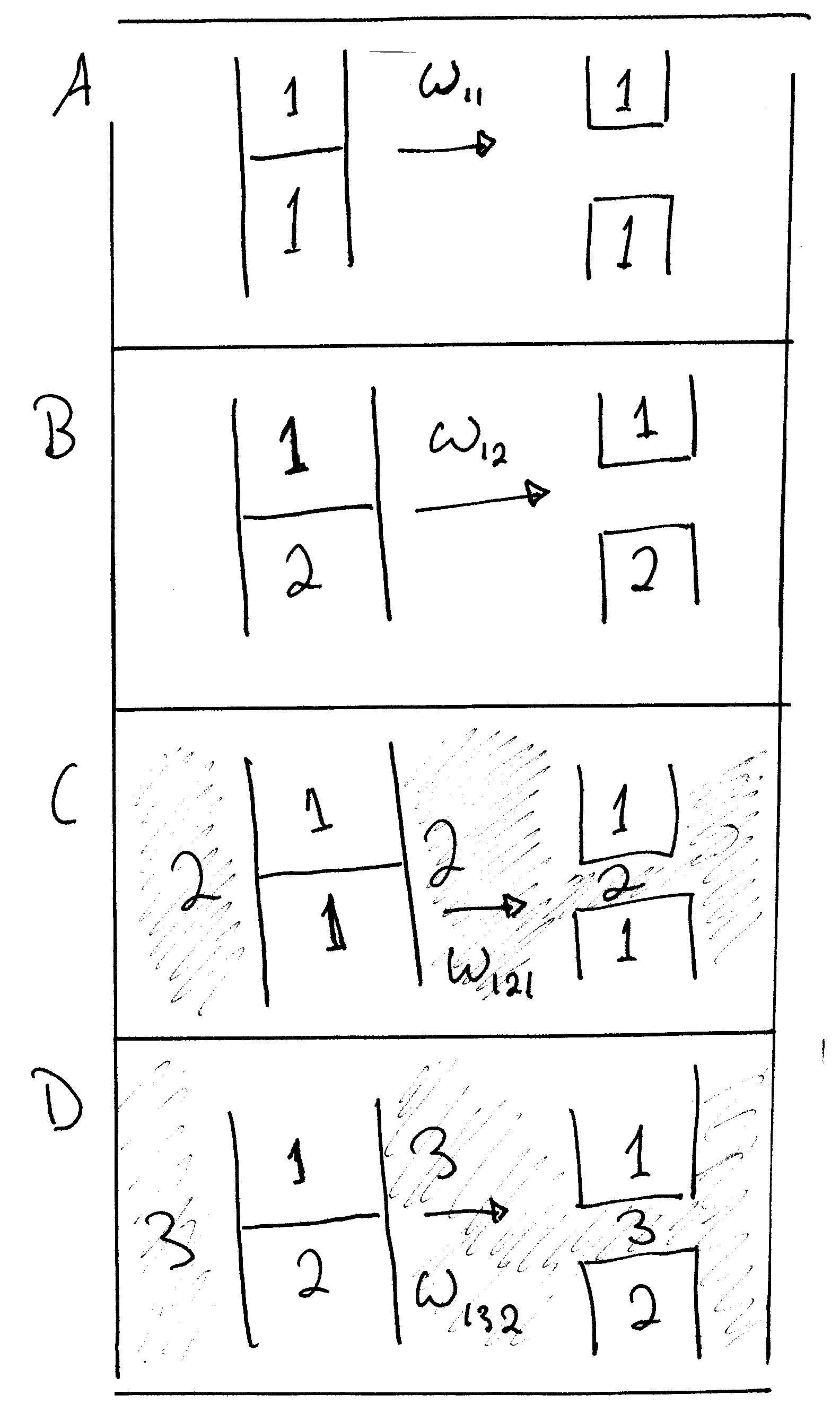
Diagram of various cases of cleavage, with each unique species labeled. A: γ = (1/2)W_{11} B: W_{12} = γ_{1} + γ_{2} – γ_{12} C: γ_{12} = (1/2)W_{121} = (1/2)W_{212} D: W_{12} + W_{33} – W_{13} – W_{23} = W_{132}.

Surface energy is conventionally defined as the work that is required to build an area of a particular surface. Another way to view the surface energy is to relate it to the work required to cleave a bulk sample, creating two surfaces. If the new surfaces are identical, the surface energy γ of each surface is equal to half the work of cleavage, W: γ = (1/2)W_{11}.

If the surfaces are unequal, the Young-Dupré equation applies: W_{12} = γ_{1} + γ_{2} – γ_{12}, where γ_{1} and γ_{2} are the surface energies of the two new surfaces, and γ_{12} is the interfacial energy.

This methodology can also be used to discuss cleavage that happens in another medium: γ_{12} = (1/2)W_{121} = (1/2)W_{212}. These two energy quantities refer to the energy that is needed to cleave one species into two pieces while it is contained in a medium of the other species. Likewise for a three species system: γ_{13} + γ_{23} – γ_{12} = W_{12} + W_{33} – W_{13} – W_{23} = W_{132}, where W_{132} is the energy of cleaving species 1 from species 2 in a medium of species 3.

A basic understanding of the terminology of cleavage energy, surface energy, and surface tension is very helpful for understanding the physical state and the events that happen at a given surface, but as discussed below, the theory of these variables also yields some interesting effects that concern the practicality of adhesive surfaces in relation to their surroundings.

== Mechanisms ==
There is no single theory covering adhesion, and particular mechanisms are specific to particular material scenarios. Five mechanisms of adhesion have been proposed to explain why one material sticks to another:

=== Mechanical ===
Adhesive materials fill the voids or pores of the surfaces and hold surfaces together by interlocking. Other interlocking phenomena are observed on different length scales. Sewing is an example of two materials forming a large scale mechanical bond, velcro forms one on a medium scale, and some textile adhesives (glue) form one at a small scale.

=== Chemical ===
Two materials may form a compound at the joint. The strongest joints are where atoms of the two materials share or swap electrons (known respectively as covalent bonding or ionic bonding). A weaker bond is formed if a hydrogen atom in one molecule is attracted to an atom of nitrogen, oxygen, or fluorine in another molecule, a phenomenon called hydrogen bonding.

Chemical adhesion occurs when the surface atoms of two separate surfaces form ionic, covalent, or hydrogen bonds. The engineering principle behind chemical adhesion in this sense is fairly straightforward: if surface molecules can bond, then the surfaces will be bonded together by a network of these bonds. It bears mentioning that these attractive ionic and covalent forces are effective over only very small distances – less than a nanometer. This means in general not only that surfaces with the potential for chemical bonding need to be brought very close together, but also that these bonds are fairly brittle, since the surfaces then need to be kept close together.

=== Dispersive ===
In dispersive adhesion, also known as physisorption, two materials are held together by van der Waals forces: the attraction between two molecules, each of which has a region of slight positive and negative charge. In the simple case, such molecules are therefore polar with respect to average charge density, although in larger or more complex molecules, there may be multiple "poles" or regions of greater positive or negative charge. These positive and negative poles may be a permanent property of a molecule (Keesom forces) or a transient effect which can occur in any molecule, as the random movement of electrons within the molecules may result in a temporary concentration of electrons in one region (London forces).

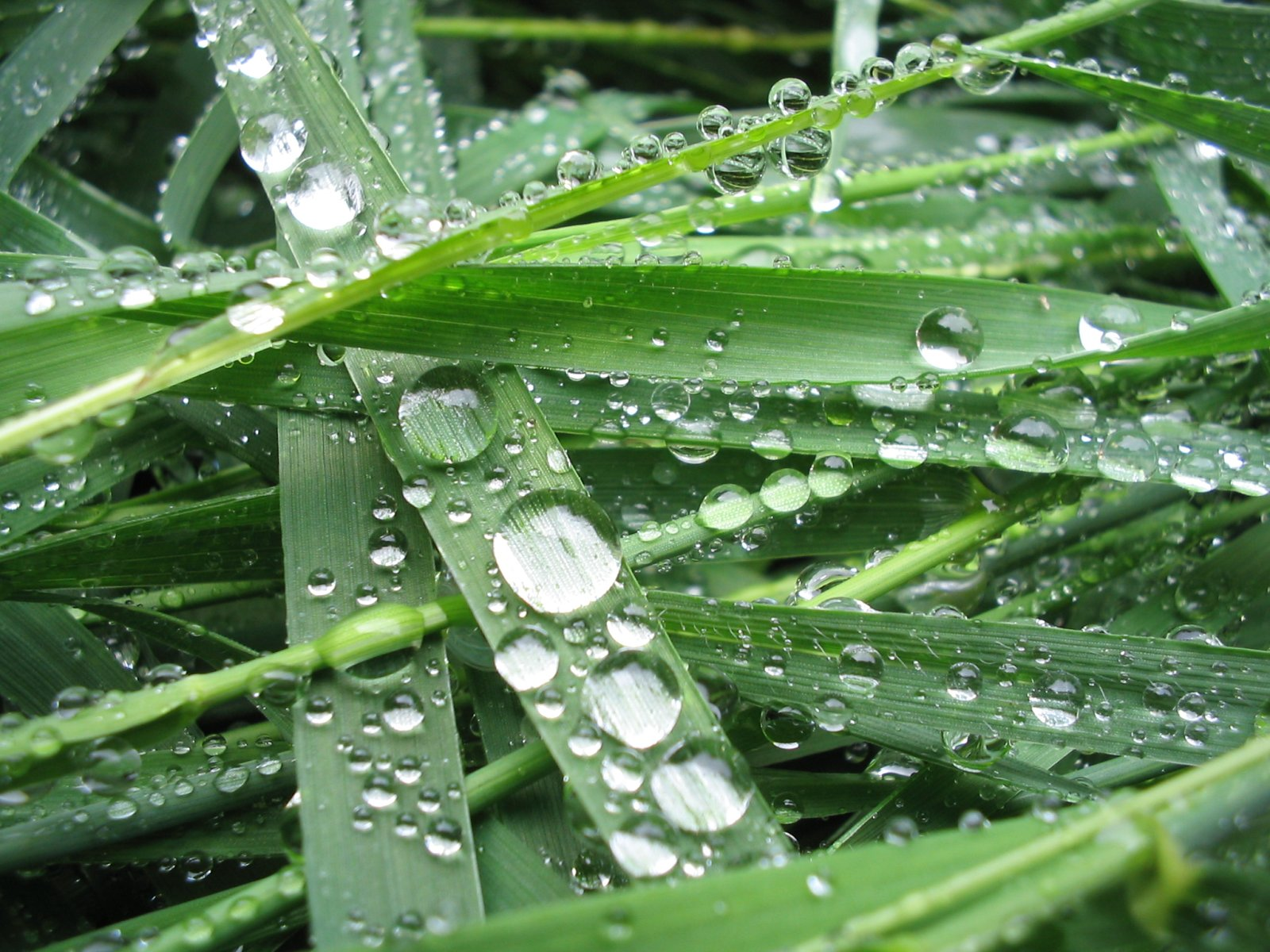
Cohesion causes water to form drops, surface tension causes them to be nearly spherical, and adhesion keeps the drops in place.

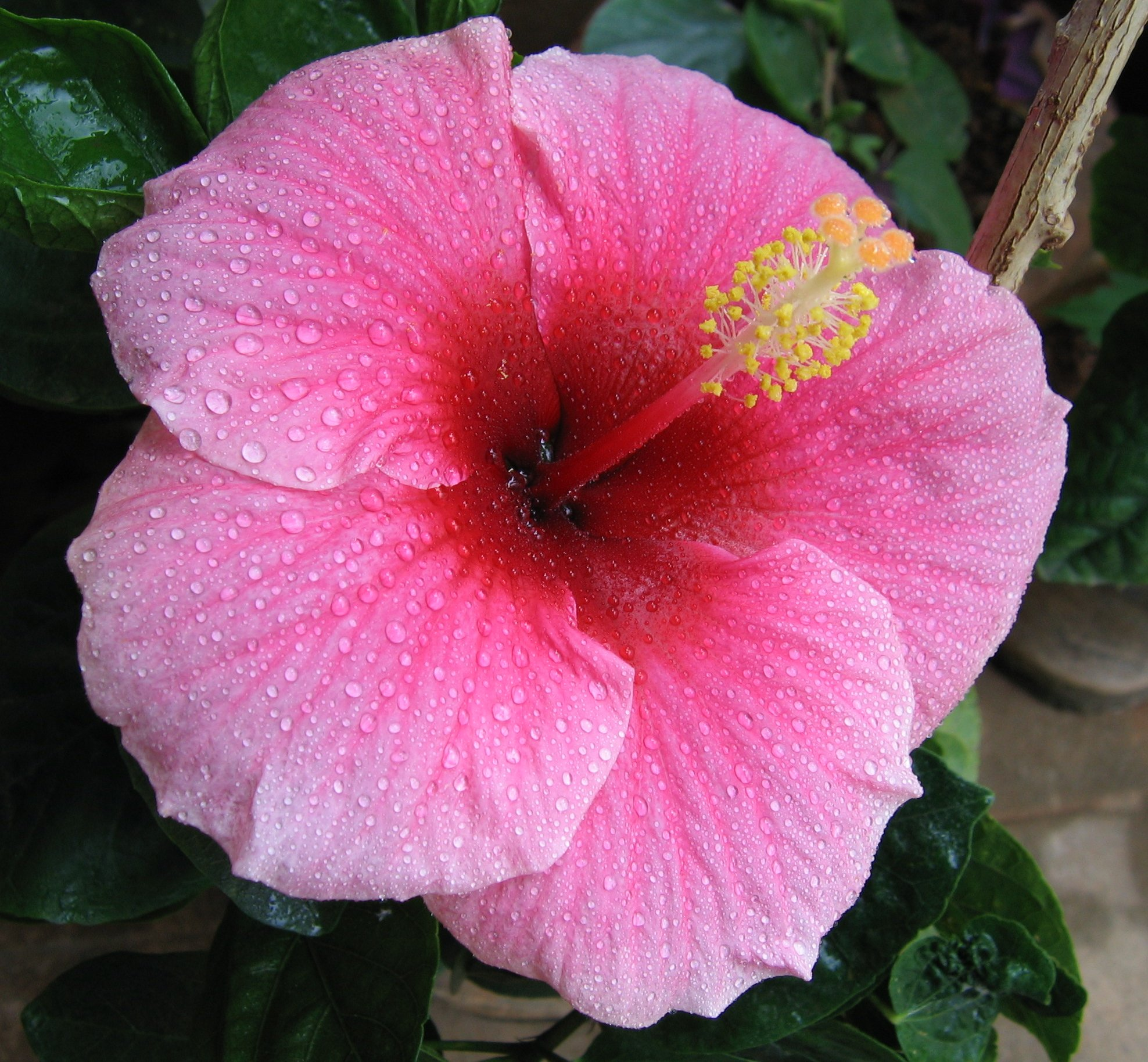
Water droplets are flatter on a Hibiscus flower which shows better adhesion.

In surface science, the term adhesion almost always refers to dispersive adhesion. In a typical solid-liquid-gas system (such as a drop of liquid on a solid surrounded by air) the contact angle is used to evaluate adhesiveness indirectly, while a Centrifugal Adhesion Balance allows for direct quantitative adhesion measurements. Generally, cases where the contact angle is low are considered of higher adhesion per unit area. This approach assumes that the lower contact angle corresponds to a higher surface energy. Theoretically, the more exact relation between contact angle and work of adhesion is more involved and is given by the Young-Dupre equation. The contact angle of the three-phase system is a function not only of dispersive adhesion (interaction between the molecules in the liquid and the molecules in the solid) but also cohesion (interaction between the liquid molecules themselves). Strong adhesion and weak cohesion results in a high degree of wetting, a lyophilic condition with low measured contact angles. Conversely, weak adhesion and strong cohesion results in lyophobic conditions with high measured contact angles and poor wetting.

London dispersion forces are particularly useful for the function of adhesive devices, because they do not require either surface to have any permanent polarity. They were described in the 1930s by Fritz London, and have been observed by many researchers. Dispersive forces are a consequence of statistical quantum mechanics. London theorized that attractive forces between molecules that cannot be explained by ionic or covalent interaction can be caused by polar moments within molecules. Multipoles could account for attraction between molecules having permanent multipole moments that participate in electrostatic interaction. However, experimental data showed that many of the compounds observed to experience van der Waals forces had no multipoles at all. London suggested that momentary dipoles are induced purely by virtue of molecules being in proximity to one another. By solving the quantum mechanical system of two electrons as harmonic oscillators at some finite distance from one another, being displaced about their respective rest positions and interacting with each other's fields, London showed that the energy of this system is given by:

$$E = 3 h \nu - \frac{3}{4} \frac{h \nu \alpha^2}{R^6}$$

While the first term is simply the zero-point energy, the negative second term describes an attractive force between neighboring oscillators. The same argument can also be extended to a large number of coupled oscillators, and thus skirts issues that would negate the large scale attractive effects of permanent dipoles cancelling through symmetry, in particular.

The additive nature of the dispersion effect has another useful consequence. Consider a single such dispersive dipole, referred to as the origin dipole. Since any origin dipole is inherently oriented so as to be attracted to the adjacent dipoles it induces, while the other, more distant dipoles are not correlated with the original dipole by any phase relation (thus on average contributing nothing), there is a net attractive force in a bulk of such particles. When considering identical particles, this is called cohesive force.

When discussing adhesion, this theory needs to be converted into terms relating to surfaces. If there is a net attractive energy of cohesion in a bulk of similar molecules, then cleaving this bulk to produce two surfaces will yield surfaces with a dispersive surface energy, since the form of the energy remain the same. This theory provides a basis for the existence of van der Waals forces at the surface, which exist between any molecules having electrons. These forces are easily observed through the spontaneous jumping of smooth surfaces into contact. Smooth surfaces of mica, gold, various polymers and solid gelatin solutions do not stay apart when their separating becomes small enough – on the order of 1–10 nm. The equation describing these attractions was predicted in the 1930s by De Boer and Hamaker:

$$\frac{P}{area} = -\frac{A}{24 \pi z^3}$$

where P is the force (negative for attraction), z is the separation distance, and A is a material-specific constant called the Hamaker constant.

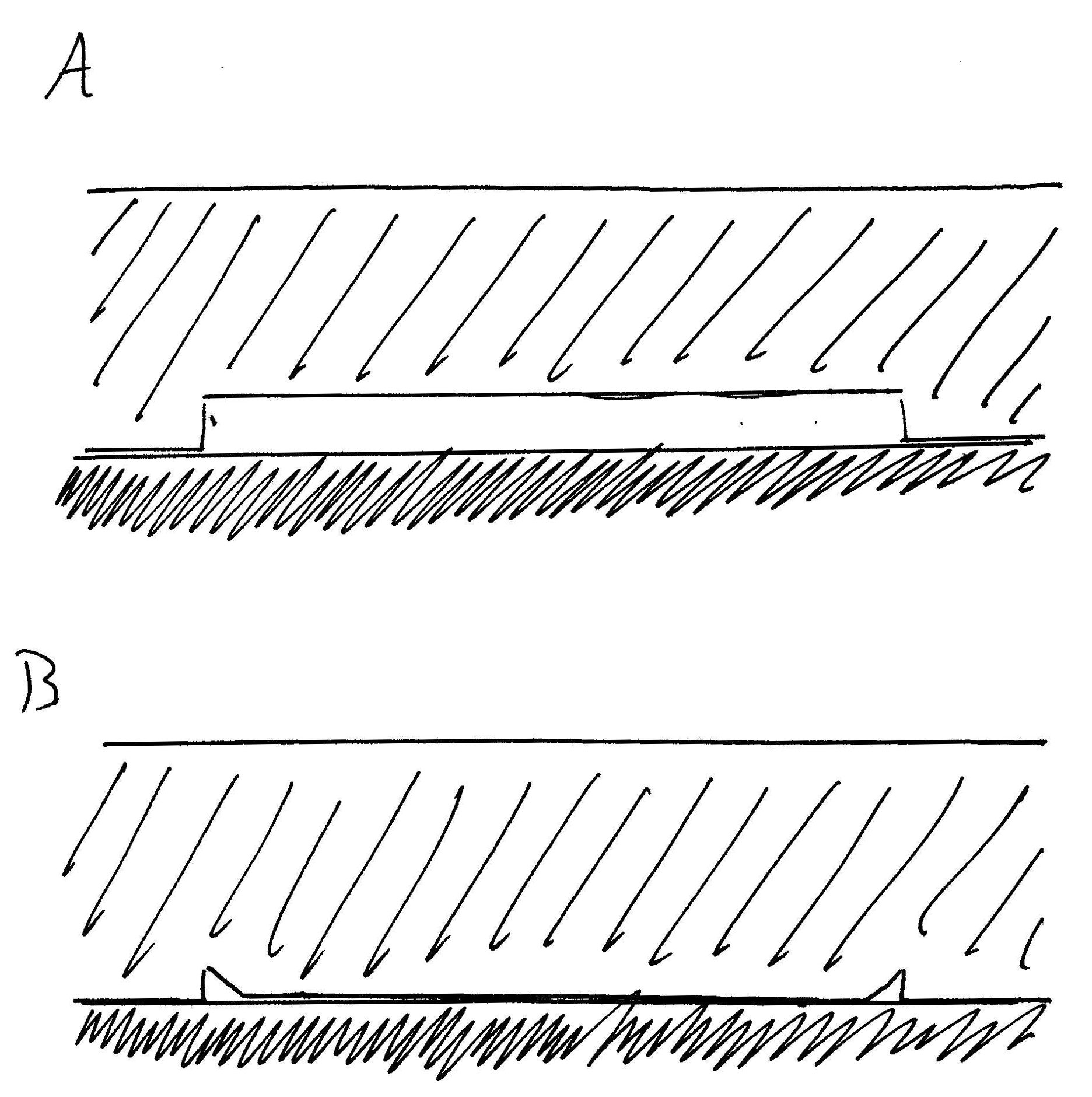
The two stages of PDMS microstructure collapse due to van der Waals attractions. The PDMS stamp is indicated by the hatched region, and the substrate is indicated by the shaded region. A) The PDMS stamp is placed on a substrate with the "roof" elevated. B) Van der Waals attractions make roof collapse energetically favorable for PDMS stamp.

The effect is also apparent in experiments where a polydimethylsiloxane (PDMS) stamp is made with small periodic post structures. The surface with the posts is placed face down on a smooth surface, such that the surface area in between each post is elevated above the smooth surface, like a roof supported by columns. Because of these attractive dispersive forces between the PDMS and the smooth substrate, the elevated surface – or "roof" – collapses down onto the substrate without any external force aside from the van der Waals attraction. Simple smooth polymer surfaces – without any microstructures – are commonly used for these dispersive adhesive properties. Decals and stickers that adhere to glass without using any chemical adhesives are fairly common as toys and decorations and useful as removable labels because they do not rapidly lose their adhesive properties, as do sticky tapes that use adhesive chemical compounds.

These forces also act over very small distances – 99% of the work necessary to break van der Waals bonds is done once surfaces are pulled more than a nanometer apart. As a result of this limited motion in both the van der Waals and ionic/covalent bonding situations, practical effectiveness of adhesion due to either or both of these interactions leaves much to be desired. Once a crack is initiated, it propagates easily along the interface because of the brittle nature of the interfacial bonds.

As an additional consequence, increasing surface area often does little to enhance the strength of the adhesion in this situation. This follows from the aforementioned crack failure – the stress at the interface is not uniformly distributed, but rather concentrated at the area of failure.

=== Electrostatic ===
Some conducting materials may pass electrons to form a difference in electrical charge at the joint. This results in a structure similar to a capacitor and creates an attractive electrostatic force between the materials.

=== Diffusive ===
Some materials may merge at the joint by diffusion. This may occur when the molecules of both materials are mobile and soluble in each other. This would be particularly effective with polymer chains where one end of the molecule diffuses into the other material. It is also the mechanism involved in sintering. When metal or ceramic powders are pressed together and heated, atoms diffuse from one particle to the next. This joins the particles into one.

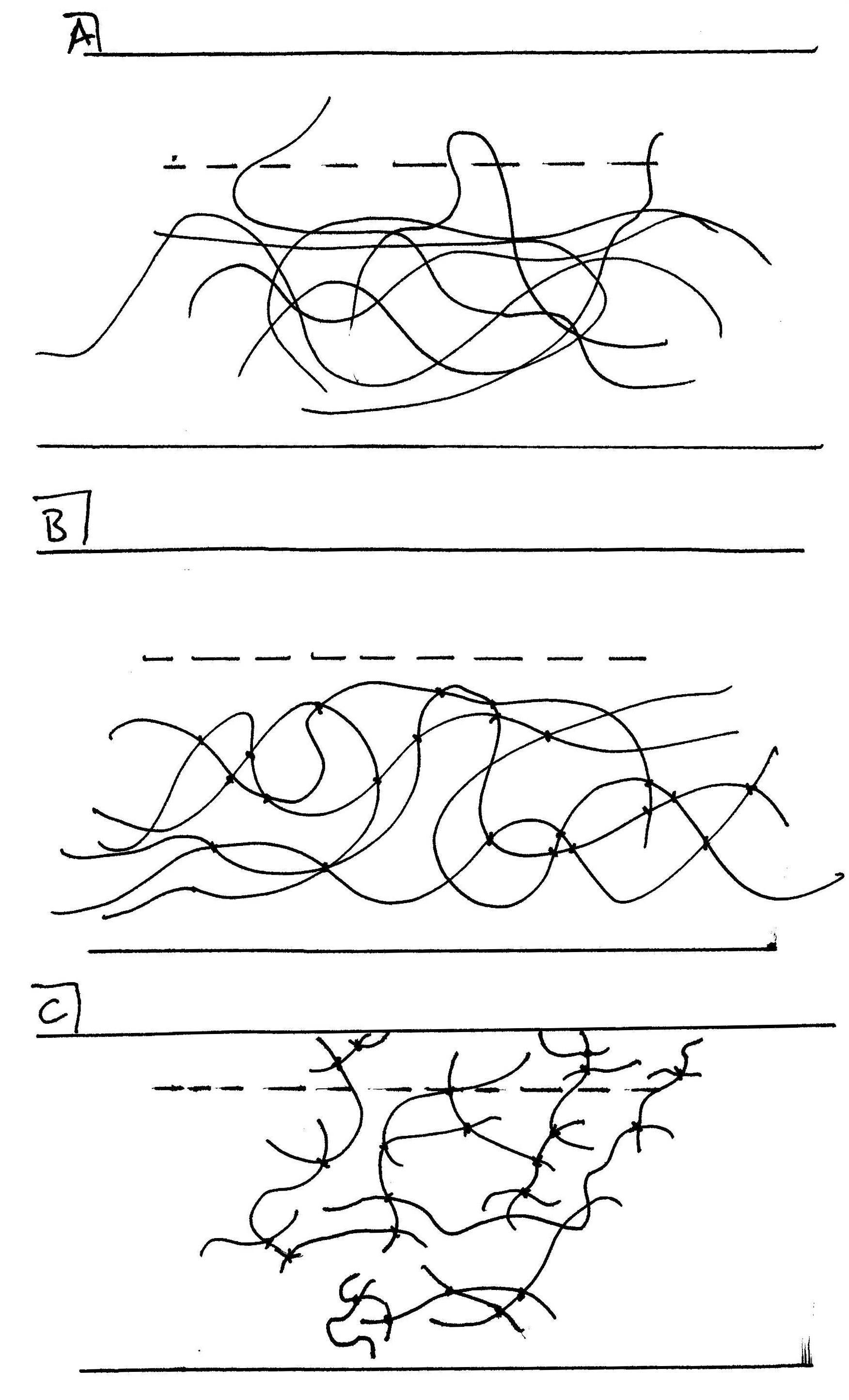
The interface is indicated by the dotted line. A) Non-crosslinked polymers are somewhat free to diffuse across the interface. One loop and two distal tails are seen diffusing. B) Crosslinked polymers not free enough to diffuse. C) "Scissed" polymers very free, with many tails extending across the interface.

Diffusive forces are somewhat like mechanical tethering at the molecular level. Diffusive bonding occurs when species from one surface penetrate into an adjacent surface while still being bound to the phase of their surface of origin. One instructive example is that of polymer-on-polymer surfaces. Diffusive bonding in polymer-on-polymer surfaces is the result of sections of polymer chains from one surface interdigitating with those of an adjacent surface. The freedom of movement of the polymers has a strong effect on their ability to interdigitate, and hence, on diffusive bonding. For example, cross-linked polymers are less capable of diffusion and interdigitation because they are bonded together at many points of contact, and are not free to twist into the adjacent surface. Uncrosslinked polymers (thermoplastics), on the other hand are freer to wander into the adjacent phase by extending tails and loops across the interface.

Another circumstance under which diffusive bonding occurs is "scission". Chain scission is the cutting up of polymer chains, resulting in a higher concentration of distal tails. The heightened concentration of these chain ends gives rise to a heightened concentration of polymer tails extending across the interface. Scission is easily achieved by ultraviolet irradiation in the presence of oxygen gas, which suggests that adhesive devices employing diffusive bonding actually benefit from prolonged exposure to heat/light and air. The longer such a device is exposed to these conditions, the more tails are scissed and branch out across the interface.

Once across the interface, the tails and loops form whatever bonds are favorable. In the case of polymer-on-polymer surfaces, this means more van der Waals forces. While these may be brittle, they are quite strong when a large network of these bonds is formed. The outermost layer of each surface plays a crucial role in the adhesive properties of such interfaces, as even a tiny amount of interdigitation – as little as one or two tails of 1.25 angstrom length – can increase the van der Waals bonds by an order of magnitude.

== Strength ==
The strength of the adhesion between two materials depends on which of the above mechanisms occur between the two materials, and the surface area over which the two materials contact. Materials that wet against each other tend to have a larger contact area than those that do not. Wetting depends on the surface energy of the materials.

Low surface energy materials such as polyethylene, polypropylene, polytetrafluoroethylene and polyoxymethylene are difficult to bond without special surface preparation.

Another factor determining the strength of an adhesive contact is its shape. Adhesive contacts of complex shape begin to detach at the "edges" of the contact area. The process of destruction of adhesive contacts can be seen in the film.

Recent experimental work has shown that adhesion-force measurements often exhibit non-Gaussian variability, and in some cases the normalized force distribution can be accurately represented using a Beta distribution.

== Other effects ==
In concert with the primary surface forces described above, there are several circumstantial effects in play. While the forces themselves each contribute to the magnitude of the adhesion between the surfaces, the following play a crucial role in the overall strength and reliability of an adhesive device.

=== Stringing ===
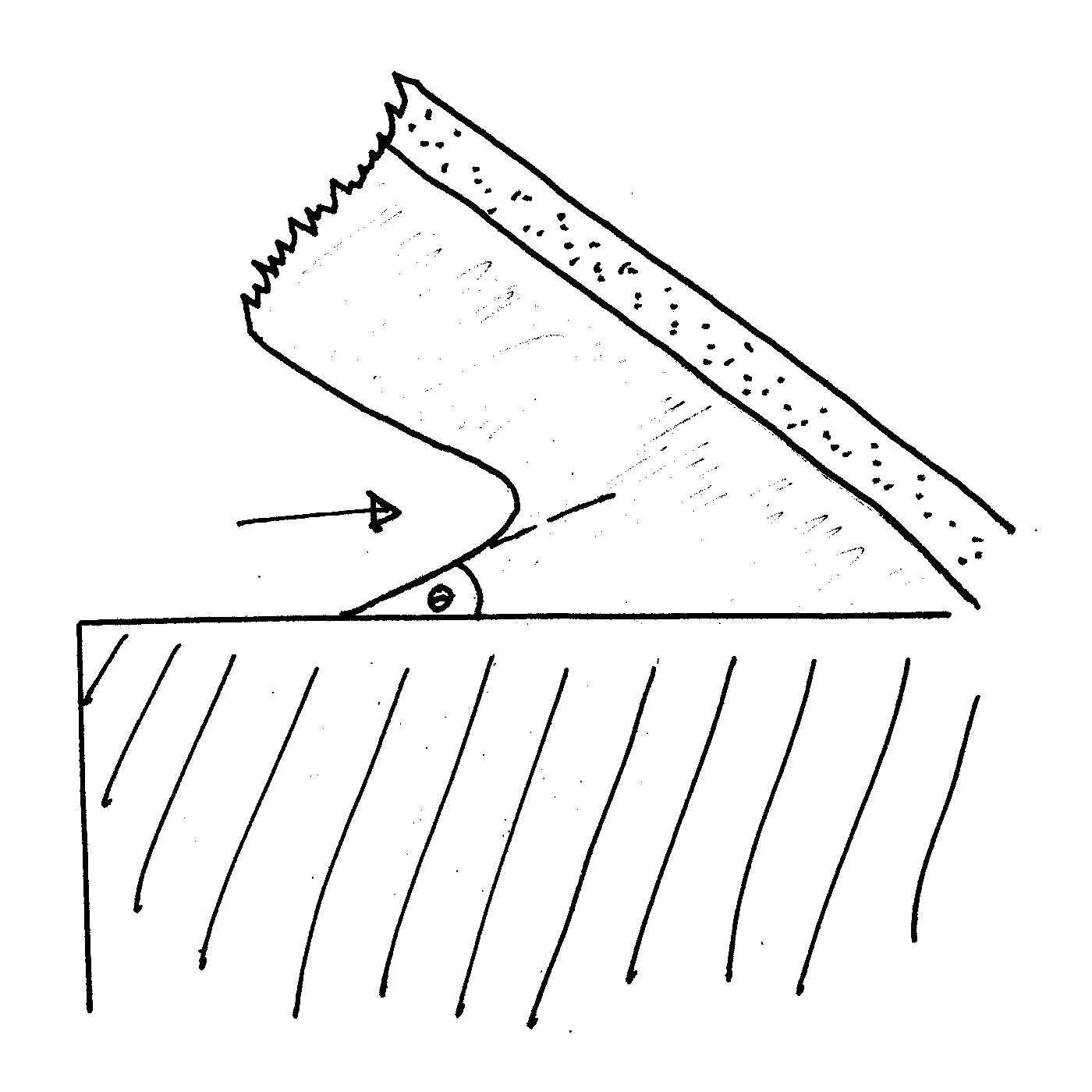
Fingering process. The hatched area is the receiving substrate, the dotted strip is the tape, and the shaded area in between is the adhesive chemical layer. The arrow indicates the direction of propagation for the fracture.

Stringing is perhaps the most crucial of these effects, and is often seen on adhesive tapes. Stringing occurs when a separation of two surfaces is beginning and molecules at the interface bridge out across the gap, rather than cracking like the interface itself. The most significant consequence of this effect is the restraint of the crack. By providing the otherwise brittle interfacial bonds with some flexibility, the molecules that are stringing across the gap can stop the crack from propagating. Another way to understand this phenomenon is by comparing it to the stress concentration at the point of failure mentioned earlier. Since the stress is now spread out over some area, the stress at any given point has less of a chance of overwhelming the total adhesive force between the surfaces. If failure does occur at an interface containing a viscoelastic adhesive agent, and a crack does propagate, it happens by a gradual process called "fingering", rather than a rapid, brittle fracture. Stringing can apply to both the diffusive bonding regime and the chemical bonding regime. The strings of molecules bridging across the gap would either be the molecules that had earlier diffused across the interface or the viscoelastic adhesive, provided that there was a significant volume of it at the interface.

=== Microstructures ===
The interplay of molecular scale mechanisms and hierarchical surface structures is known to result in high levels of static friction and bonding between pairs of surfaces. Technologically advanced adhesive devices sometimes make use of microstructures on surfaces, such as tightly packed periodic posts. These are biomimetic technologies inspired by the adhesive abilities of the feet of various arthropods and vertebrates (most notably, geckos). By intermixing periodic breaks into smooth, adhesive surfaces, the interface acquires valuable crack-arresting properties. Because crack initiation requires much greater stress than does crack propagation, surfaces like these are much harder to separate, as a new crack has to be restarted every time the next individual microstructure is reached.

=== Hysteresis ===
Hysteresis, in this case, refers to the restructuring of the adhesive interface over some period of time, with the result being that the work needed to separate two surfaces is greater than the work that was gained by bringing them together (W > γ_{1} + γ_{2}). For the most part, this is a phenomenon associated with diffusive bonding. The more time is given for a pair of surfaces exhibiting diffusive bonding to restructure, the more diffusion will occur, the stronger the adhesion will become. The aforementioned reaction of certain polymer-on-polymer surfaces to ultraviolet radiation and oxygen gas is an instance of hysteresis, but it will also happen over time without those factors.

In addition to being able to observe hysteresis by determining if W > γ_{1} + γ_{2} is true, one can also find evidence of it by performing "stop-start" measurements. In these experiments, two surfaces slide against one another continuously and occasionally stopped for some measured amount of time. Results from experiments on polymer-on-polymer surfaces show that if the stopping time is short enough, resumption of smooth sliding is easy. If, however, the stopping time exceeds some limit, there is an initial increase of resistance to motion, indicating that the stopping time was sufficient for the surfaces to restructure.

=== Wettability and absorption ===
Some atmospheric effects on the functionality of adhesive devices can be characterized by following the theory of surface energy and interfacial tension. It is known that γ_{12} = (1/2)W_{121} = (1/2)W_{212}. If γ_{12} is high, then each species finds it favorable to cohere while in contact with a foreign species, rather than dissociate and mix with the other. If this is true, then it follows that when the interfacial tension is high, the force of adhesion is weak, since each species does not find it favorable to bond to the other. The interfacial tension of a liquid and a solid is directly related to the liquid's wettability (relative to the solid), and thus one can extrapolate that cohesion increases in non-wetting liquids and decreases in wetting liquids. One example that verifies this is polydimethyl siloxane rubber, which has a work of self-adhesion of 43.6 mJ/m^{2} in air, 74 mJ/m^{2} in water (a nonwetting liquid) and 6 mJ/m^{2} in methanol (a wetting liquid).

This argument can be extended to the idea that when a surface is in a medium with which binding is favorable, it will be less likely to adhere to another surface, since the medium is taking up the potential sites on the surface that would otherwise be available to adhere to another surface. Naturally this applies very strongly to wetting liquids, but also to gas molecules that could adsorb onto the surface in question, thereby occupying potential adhesion sites. This last point is actually fairly intuitive: Leaving an adhesive exposed to air too long gets it dirty, and its adhesive strength will decrease. This is observed in the experiment: when mica is cleaved in air, its cleavage energy, W_{121} or W_{mica/air/mica}, is smaller than the cleavage energy in vacuum, W_{mica/vac/mica}, by a factor of 13.

=== Lateral adhesion ===
Lateral adhesion is associated with sliding one object on a substrate, such as sliding a drop on a surface. When the two objects are solids, either with or without a liquid between them, the lateral adhesion is described as friction. However, the behavior of lateral adhesion between a drop and a surface is tribologically very different from friction between solids, and the naturally adhesive contact between a flat surface and a liquid drop makes the lateral adhesion in this case, an individual field. Lateral adhesion can be measured using the centrifugal adhesion balance (CAB), which uses a combination of centrifugal and gravitational forces to decouple the normal and lateral forces in the problem.

== See also ==
- Adhesive
- Adhesive bonding
- Bacterial adhesin
- Capillary action
- Cell adhesion
- Contact mechanics
- Electroadhesion
- Fracture mechanics
- Galling
- Insect adhesion
- Meniscus
- Mucoadhesion
- Pressure-sensitive adhesive
- Rail adhesion
- Synthetic setae
- Wetting
- Cohesion number
