= Charged particle beam =

Spatially localized group of electrically charged particles travelling in same direction

A charged particle beam is a spatially localized group of electrically charged particles that have approximately the same position, kinetic energy (resulting in the same velocity), and direction. The kinetic energies of the particles are much larger than the energies of particles at ambient temperature. The high energy and directionality of charged particle beams make them useful for many applications in particle physics (see Particle beam#Applications and Electron-beam technology).

Such beams can be split into two main classes:

1. unbunched beams (coasting beams or DC beams), which have no longitudinal substructure in the direction of beam motion.
2. bunched beams, in which the particles are distributed into pulses (bunches) of particles. Bunched beams are most common in modern facilities, since the most modern particle accelerators require bunched beams for acceleration.

Assuming a normal distribution of particle positions and impulses, a charged particle beam (or a bunch of the beam) is characterized by

- the species of particle, e.g. electrons, protons, or atomic nuclei
- the mean energy of the particles, often expressed in electronvolts (typically keV to GeV)
- the (average) particle current, often expressed in amperes
- the particle beam size, often using the so-called β-function
- the beam emittance, a measure of the area occupied by the beam in one of several phase spaces.

These parameters can be expressed in various ways. For example, the current and beam size can be combined into the current density, and the current and energy (or beam voltage V) can be combined into the perveance K = I V^{−3/2}.

The charged particle beams that can be manipulated in particle accelerators can be subdivided into electron beams, ion beams and proton beams.

== Common types ==
- Electron beam such as in a scanning electron microscope, in accelerators such as the Large Electron–Positron Collider, synchrotron light sources, or in cathode ray tubes
- Proton beam, such as the beams used in proton therapy, at colliders such as the Tevatron and the Large Hadron Collider, or for proton beam writing in lithography.
- Ion beams, such as at the Relativistic Heavy Ion Collider or the Facility for Rare Isotope Beams.
