= Dispersive adhesion =

Adhesion between materials due to intermolecular interactions

A Pacific leaping blenny climbing up a Plexiglas plate

Dispersive adhesion, also called adsorptive adhesion, is a mechanism for adhesion which attributes attractive forces between two materials to intermolecular interactions between molecules of each material. This mechanism is widely viewed as the most important of the five mechanisms of adhesion due to its presence in every type of adhesive system and its relative strength.

== Source of dispersive adhesion attractions ==
The source of adhesive forces, according to the dispersive adhesion mechanism, is the weak interactions that occur between molecules close together. These interactions include London dispersion forces, Keesom forces, Debye forces and hydrogen bonds. Individually, these attractions are not very strong, but when summed over the bulk of a material, they can become significant.

=== London dispersion ===
London dispersion forces arise from instantaneous dipoles between two nonpolar molecules close together. The random nature of electron orbit allows moments in which the charge distribution in a molecule is unevenly distributed, allowing an electrostatic attraction to another molecule with a temporary dipole. A larger molecule allows for a larger dipole, and thus will have stronger dispersion forces.

=== Keesom ===
Keesom forces, also known as dipole–dipole interactions, result from two molecules that have permanent dipoles due to electronegativity differences between atoms in the molecule. This dipole causes a coulombic attraction between the two molecules.

=== Debye ===
Debye forces, or dipole–induced dipole interactions, can also play a role in dispersive adhesion. These come about when a nonpolar molecule becomes temporarily polarized due to interaction with a nearby polar molecule. This "induced dipole" in the nonpolar molecule then is attracted to the permanent dipole, yielding a Debye attraction.

=== Hydrogen bonding ===
Sometimes grouped into the chemical mechanism of adhesion, hydrogen bonding can increase adhesive strength by the dispersive mechanism. Hydrogen bonding occurs between molecules with a hydrogen atom attached to a small, electronegative atom such as fluorine, oxygen or nitrogen. This bond is naturally polar, with the hydrogen atom gaining a slight positive charge and the other atom becoming slightly negative. Two molecules, or even two functional groups on one large molecule, may then be attracted to each other via Keesom forces.

== Factors affecting adhesion strength ==
The strength of adhesion by the dispersive mechanism depends on a variety of factors, including the chemical structure of the molecules involved in the adhesive system, the degree to which coatings wet each other, and the surface roughness at the interface.

=== Chemical composition ===
The chemical structure of the materials involved in a given adhesive system plays a large role in the adhesion of the system as a whole because the structure determines the type and strength of the intermolecular interactions present. All things equal, larger molecules, which experience higher dispersion forces, will have a larger adhesive strength than smaller molecules of the same basic chemical fingerprint. Similarly, polar molecules will have Keesom and Debye forces not experienced by nonpolar molecules of similar size. Compounds which can hydrogen bond across the adhesive interface will have even greater adhesive strength.

=== Wetting ===
Wetting is a measure of the thermodynamic compatibility of two surfaces. If the surfaces are well-matched, the surfaces will "desire" to interact with each other, minimizing the surface energy of both phases, and the surfaces will come into close contact. Because the intermolecular attractions strongly correlate with distance, the closer the interacting molecules are together, the stronger the attraction. Thus, two materials that wet well and have a large amount of surface area in contact will have stronger intermolecular attractions and a larger adhesive strength due to the dispersive mechanism.

=== Roughness ===
Surface roughness can also affect the adhesive strength. Surfaces with roughness on the scale of 1–2 micrometres can yield better wetting because they have a larger surface area. Thus, more intermolecular interactions at closer distances can arise, yielding stronger attractions and larger adhesive strength. Once the roughness becomes larger, on the order of 10 micrometres, the coating can no longer wet effectively, resulting in less contact area and a smaller adhesive strength.

=== Macroscopic shape ===
Adhesive strength depends also on the size and macroscopic shape of adhesive contact. When a rigid punch with a flat but oddly shaped face is carefully pulled off its soft counterpart, the detachment does not occur instantaneously. Instead, detachment fronts start at pointed corners and travel inwards until the final configuration is reached. The main parameter determining the adhesive strength of flat contacts appears to be the maximum linear size of the contact. The process of detachment can as observed experimentally can be seen in the film.

== Systems dominated by dispersive adhesion ==
All materials, even those not usually classified as adhesives, experience an attraction to other materials simply due to dispersion forces. In many situations, these attractions are trivial; however, dispersive adhesion plays a dominant role in various adhesive systems, especially when multiple forms of intermolecular attractions are present. It has been shown by experimental methods that the dispersive mechanism of adhesion plays a large role in the overall adhesion of polymeric systems in particular.

== See also ==
- Adhesion
- Intermolecular force
- Van der Waals forces
- Hydrogen bonding
