= Erika Cremer =

German chemist (1900–1996)

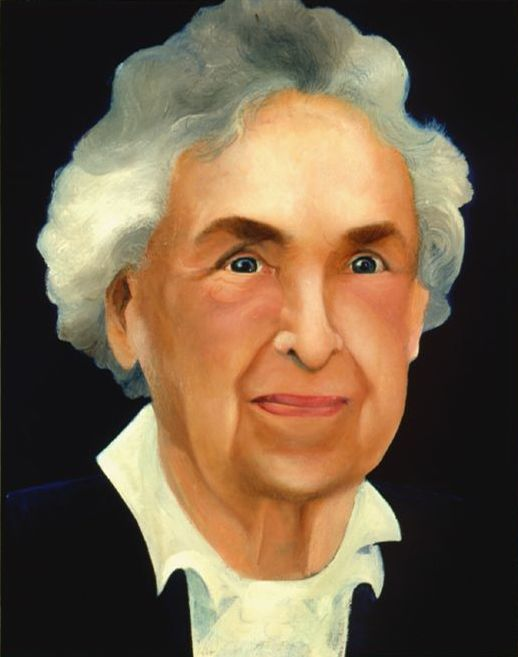
- Portrait of Erika Cremer by Letizia Mancino Cremer
- Born: 20 May 1900; Munich, Germany
- Died: 21 September 1996 (aged 96); Innsbruck, Austria
- Education: University of Berlin
- Known for: Developing gas chromatography
- Scientific career
- Fields: Gas chromatography
- Workplaces: University of Innsbruck
- Thesis: Über die Reaktion zwischen Chlor, Wasserstoff und Sauerstoff im Licht (1927)
- Doctoral advisor: Max Bodenstein
- Other academic advisors: Karl Friedrich Bonhoeffer; George de Hevesy; Michael Polanyi; Otto Hahn

Erika Cremer (20 May 1900, Munich – 21 September 1996, Innsbruck) was a German physical chemist and Professor Emeritus at the University of Innsbruck who is regarded as one of the most important pioneers in gas chromatography, as she second conceived the technique in 1944, after Richard Synge and Archer J.P. Martin in 1941.

== Family ==
Cremer was born on 20 May 1900 in Munich, Germany into a family of scientists and university professors. She was the only daughter and middle child of Max Cremer and Elsbeth Rosmund. Her father, Max Cremer, was a professor of physiology and the inventor of the glass electrode. She had two brothers, Hubert Cremer, a mathematician, and Lothar Cremer, an acoustician.

== Education and early career ==
Cremer's father moved to a new position in Berlin and Cremer had trouble adjusting to the new Prussian school system. Cremer graduated high school in Berlin in 1921 and matriculated to the University of Berlin to study chemistry. At the University of Berlin, she attended lectures by Fritz Haber, Walther Nernst, Max Planck, Max von Laue, and Albert Einstein.

Cremer received her Ph.D. magna cum laude six years later in 1927 under Max Bodenstein. Her dissertation was on the kinetics of the hydrogen-chlorine reaction. The paper was published under her name only because it concluded that the hydrogen-chlorine reaction was a chain reaction, which was still considered an extremely original concept for that time. Because of this paper and her work on kinetics, the future Nobel Laureate for the study of kinetics, Nikolay Semyonov invited her to Leningrad to work. She refused and remained in Germany to work at the Kaiser Wilhelm Institute for Physical Chemistry and Electrochemistry with Karl Friedrich Bonhoeffer on the quantum theoretical problems of photochemistry.

Cremer studied the breakdown of alcohols using oxide catalysts on scholarship at the University of Freiburg with George de Hevesy for a brief time. Cremer returned to Berlin to work with Michael Polanyi at Haber's Institut, where they investigated the conversion of hydrogen and ortho-hydrogen in one spin state to para-hydrogen. She remained there until 1933 when the Nazi party came to power in Germany and the institute was dissolved for its reputation as anti-Nazi. Cremer was unable to find work or continue research for four years.

== Scientific career before and during World War II ==
Cremer joined Otto Hahn at Kaiser Wilhelm Institute for Chemistry to study radioactive trace compounds in 1937. She moved labs shortly after to concentrate on isotope separation. In 1938, Cremer received her habilitation from the University of Berlin. In any ordinary case, this qualification would lead to faculty positions; however, the Nazi government of the time had passed the Law on the Legal Position of Female Public Servants. The law banned women from senior positions (e.g. professorship) and required women to quit once married. Many women scientists and scholars were left unemployed or limited in career prospects.

After World War II began and male scientists and professors were drafted, Cremer was able to obtain a position as a docent in 1940 at the University of Innsbruck in Austria. However, she was informed that she would leave her job once the war had ended and the men came home. Cremer was pleased with her new position and location because she was able to mountain climb, a hobby of hers.

== Gas separation discovery and development ==
At Innsbruck, Cremer researched the hydrogenation of acetylene and found difficulty separating two gases with similar adsorption heats using the common methods of the day. She was aware of the liquid absorption chromatography research going on at Innsbruck, so she thought of a parallel method to separate gases which used an inert carrier gas as the mobile phase. She developed mathematical relationships and equations and instrumentation for the first gas chromatograph. Separate components were detected by a thermal conductivity detector. She initially submitted a short academic paper in 1944 to Naturwissenschaften, which was accepted and she informed them that future experimental work would follow. The paper however was not published at the time, because the journal's printing press was destroyed during air bombardment. It was finally published thirty years later in 1976 at which point it was considered a historical document.

In December 1944, the university's facilities were badly damaged in an air bombardment and after the war, Cremer, as a German citizen, was not allowed to use the limited facilities. Fritz Prior was one of her postwar students and a high school chemistry teacher. He chose her idea of the gas chromatograph for his dissertation. Until facilities at the University of Innsbruck were usable again, he used his high school's laboratory to continue Cremer's research with her. When the university partially reopened, Cremer was still temporarily banned from work due to her German citizenship and would secretly visit the university in a delivery truck to continue research.

Cremer was allowed to return to her work in late 1945. Prior completed the research demonstrating a novel method for measurements and qualitative and quantitative analysis in 1947. Another student of Cremer's, Roland Müller wrote his dissertation on the analytical possibilities of the gas chromatograph. Cremer was appointed director of the Physical Chemistry Institute at Innsbruck and was made a professor in 1951. Cremer began presenting Prior and Müller's work in 1947 at various scientific meetings. In 1951, three papers on Cremer's work were published in Zeitschrift für Elektrochemie, a lesser known German scientific journal. The scientific community responded to presentations and papers either negatively or not at all. Many believed that older methods were sufficient. In 1952, the British Anthony Trafford James and Archer Porter Martin and in 1953, the Czech J. Janak published reports claiming the invention of gas chromatography. Martin and his partner Richard Laurence Millington Synge won the Nobel Prize for partition chromatography, which is often credited for introducing the use of gas as a mobile phase, in 1952. All were completely ignorant of Cremer's early work. This has been attributed to the fact that Cremer spoke to the wrong people in the wrong places. Austrian analytical and micro chemists did not focus on gases, so the idea did not gain interest. Also, in the post-war years, communication between English and German scientists was poor. Following the new reports, the method of gas chromatography spread widely and Cremer's work slowly gained more recognition.

Cremer and her students continued their work on developing both the methods and theories behind gas chromatography over the next two decades and led to many of contemporary, common use ideas used in gas chromatography. Cremer and her group created the phrase "relative retention time" and how to calculate the peak area through multiplying the peak's height by the width of the peak at half height. Additionally, they demonstrated the relationship between measurement and column temperature and also invented head space analysis.

== Later career and death ==
Cremer continued research at the University of Innsbruck and retired in 1971. She remained active in gas chromatography until almost the end of life. In 1990, an international symposium celebrating her work and her ninetieth birthday was held in Innsbruck. She died in 1996.

In 2009, the University of Innsbruck established a program in her name which awards highly qualified women scientist in pursuit of a habilitation degree.

== Awards and honors ==
- Wilhelm Exner Medal, 1958
- Johann Josef Ritter von Precht Medal of TU wien, 1965
- Erwin Schrödinger Prize of the Austrian Academy of Sciences, 1970
- M.S. Tswett Chromatography Award, 1974 (first year awarded)
- Commemorative M.S. Tswett Medal of the U.S.S.R. Academy of Sciences, 1978
- Honorary degree from the Technische Universität Berlin
- First-class cross of the Austrian Order for Science and Art
- A Street in Munich was called after her (Erika-Cremer-Straße in 81829 München)

== Museum exhibition ==
Deutsches Museum opened an exhibition on 3 November 1995 which featured Cremer's work in its branch in Bonn, explaining to the public how she built the first gas chromatograph with Fritz Prior in the 1940s.
