= Bodenstein number =

Dimensionless parameter in chemistry

- Common symbols: $\mathit{Bo}$
- Derivations from other quantities: $\mathit{Bo}= \frac{u \cdot L}{D_\mathrm{ax}}$
- Dimension: dimensionless

The Bodenstein number (abbreviated Bo, named after Max Bodenstein) is a dimensionless parameter in chemical reaction engineering, which describes the ratio of the amount of substance introduced by convection to that introduced by diffusion. Hence, it characterises the backmixing in a system and allows statements whether and how much volume elements or substances within a chemical reactor mix due to the prevalent currents. It is defined as the ratio of the convection current to the dispersion current. The Bodenstein number is an element of the dispersion model of residence times and is therefore also called the dimensionless dispersion coefficient.

Mathematically, two idealized extreme cases exist for the Bodenstein number. These, however, cannot be fully reached in practice:

- $Bo = 0$ corresponds to full backmixing, which is the ideal state to be reached in a continuous stirred-tank reactor.
- $Bo = \infty$ corresponds to no backmixing, but a continuous through flow as in an ideal flow channel.

Control of the flow velocity within a reactor allows to adjust the Bodenstein number to a pre-calculated desired value, so that the desired degree of backmixing of the substances in the reactor can be reached.

== Determination of the Bodenstein number ==
The Bodenstein number is calculated according to

$$\mathit{Bo}=\frac{u \cdot L}{D_\mathrm{ax}}$$

where

- $u$: flow velocity
- $L$: length of the reactor
- $D_\mathrm{ax}$: axial dispersion coefficient

It can also be determined experimentally from the distribution of the residence times. Assuming an open system:

$$\sigma_\theta^2=\frac{\sigma^2}{\tau^2}=\frac{2}{\mathit{Bo}}+\frac{8}{\mathit{Bo}^2}$$

holds, where

- $\sigma^{2}_{\theta}$: dimensionless variance
- $\sigma^2$: variance of the mean residence time
- $\tau$: hydrodynamic residence time

The Bodenstein number is similar to the Péclet number, which is applied in thermodynamics and in fluid mechanics. The axial dispersion coefficient correlates with the axial Péclet number.

$\mathit{Pe_{ax}}=\frac{u \cdot \widetilde{L}}{D_{ax}}$

where

- $\widetilde{L}$: – characteristic length

$\mathit{Bo}=\mathit{Pe_{ax}}\cdot\frac{\widetilde{L}}{L}$
