= Perveance =

Perveance is a notion used in the description of charged particle beams. The value of perveance indicates how significant the space charge effect is on the beam's motion. The term is used primarily for electron beams, in which motion is often dominated by the space charge.

== Origin of the word ==
The word was probably created from Latin pervenio–to attain.

== Definition ==
For an electron gun, the gun perveance $P$ is determined as a coefficient of proportionality between a space-charge limited current, $I$, and the gun anode voltage, $U_a$, in three-half power in the Child-Langmuir law

${I} = {P}\cdot U_a^\frac{3}{2}$

The same notion is used for non-relativistic beams propagating through a vacuum chamber. In this case, the beam is assumed to have been accelerated in a stationary electric field so that $U_a$ is the potential difference between the emitter and the vacuum chamber, and the ratio of $\frac{I}{U_a^\frac{3}{2}}$ is referred to as a beam perveance. In equations describing motion of relativistic beams, contribution of the space charge appears as a dimensionless parameter called the generalized perveance $K$ defined as

${K} = \frac{{I}}{{I_0}}\cdot\frac{{2}}{{\beta}^3{\gamma}^3}\cdot (1-\gamma^2f_e)$,

where ${I_0}=4\pi\varepsilon_{0}\cdot\frac{m c^3}{e}\approx 17 \mathrm{kA}$ (for electrons) is the Budker (or Alfven) current; $\mathbf{\beta}$ and $\mathbf{\gamma}$ are the relativistic factors, and $f_e$ is the neutralization factor.

== Examples ==
The 6S4A is an example of a high perveance triode. The triode section of a 6AU8A becomes a high-perveance diode when its control grid is employed as the anode. Each section of a 6AL5 is a high-perveance diode as opposed to a 1J3 which requires over 100 V to reach only 2 mA.

Perveance does not relate directly to current handling. Another high-perveance diode, the diode section of a 33GY7, shows similar perveance to a 6AL5, but handles 15 times greater current, at almost 13 times maximum peak inverse voltage.
