= Max Bodenstein =

German chemist (1871–1942)

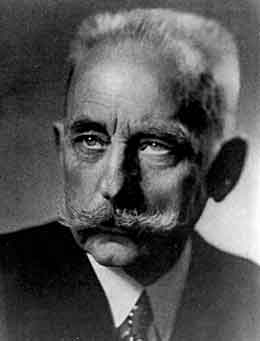
- Max Bodenstein
- Born: Max Ernst August Bodenstein; July 15, 1871; Magdeburg, German Empire
- Died: September 3, 1942 (aged 71); Berlin, Germany
- Education: University of Heidelberg
- Known for: Bodenstein number, a special type of Peclet number
- Scientific career
- Workplaces: University of Leipzig; Humboldt University of Berlin; Leibniz University Hannover
- Thesis: Über die Zersetzung des Jodwasserstoffes in der Hitze (1893)
- Doctoral advisor: Victor Meyer
- Doctoral students: Erika Cremer

Max Ernst August Bodenstein (July 15, 1871 – September 3, 1942) was a German physical chemist known for his work in chemical kinetics. He was first to postulate a chain reaction mechanism and that explosions are branched chain reactions, later applied to the atomic bomb.

== Early life ==
Max Bodenstein was born in Magdeburg on 15 July 1871 as the eldest son of Magdeburg merchant and brewer Franz Bodenstein (1834–1885) and his first wife Elise Meissner (1846–1876).

== Education ==
In 1888, Max Bodenstein enrolled at the University of Heidelberg at the age of 17 to study chemistry with Carl Remigius Fresenius. On 25 October 1893, he received his PhD thesis: "Über die Zersetzung des Jodwasserstoffes in der Hitze" (On the degradation of hydrogen iodide in hot temperature), with Victor Meyer as his supervisor at the University of Heidelberg.

Following graduation, Bodenstein received two years of additional training in Berlin-Charlottenburg and Göttingen. Bodenstein studied organic chemistry and catalysis in flowing systems and discovered diffusion controlled catalytic reactions and photochemical reactions with Karl Liebermann at the Technische Hochschule in Charlottenburg (now Technische Universität Berlin), and physical chemistry with Walther Nernst at the University of Göttingen.

== Career ==
In 1896, Max Bodenstein returned to the University of Heidelberg, where he studied decomposition of hydrohalic acids and their formation.

In 1899, he habilitated with the theme: "Gasreaktionen in der chemischen Kinetik" (Gas reactions in chemical kinetics).

In 1900, Max Bodenstein became Lecturer at the physicochemical institute of Wilhelm Ostwald at University of Leipzig. In 1904, he was appointed as Titularprofessor at the same institute.

In 1906, he became associate professor at the University of Berlin and department head at the physicochemical institute of Walther Nernst.

In 1908, he decided to change to the University of Hannover where he was appointed ordinary professor in electrochemistry and director of the electrochemical institute. He also became professor of physical chemistry in 1911.

In 1923, he returned to Berlin where he accepted to be ordinary professor of physical chemistry and director of the physicochemical institute after the retirement of Walther Nernst. He kept these positions until he retired in 1936.

Max Bodenstein was also member of the "German Atomgewichtskommission" (German Commission of Atomic Weights) and co-editor of the journal "Physikalische Chemie" (Physical chemistry).

== Contributions ==
Max Bodenstein is considered to be one of the founders of chemical kinetics.

He started by detailed experimental work on the formation of hydrogen iodide. His technique was to mix hydrogen and iodine in a sealed tube, which he placed in a thermostat and held at a constant high temperature. The reaction eventually reached an equilibrium, at which the rate of formation of hydrogen iodide was equal to the rate of decomposition to the original reaction (H_{2} + I_{2} ≡ 2HI). The equilibrium mixture of hydrogen, iodine, and hydrogen iodide was frozen by rapid cooling, and the amount of hydrogen iodide present could be analyzed. Using different amounts of initial reactants, Bodenstein could vary the amounts present at equilibrium and verify the law of chemical equilibrium proposed in 1863 by Cato Maximilian Guldberg and Peter Waage. His work, published in 1899, was one of the first equilibrium investigations over an extended temperature range.

Bodenstein also investigated in photochemistry, being first to demonstrate that, in the reaction of hydrogen with chlorine, the high performance could explain by means of a chain reaction. Future inventor of the gas chromatograph, Erika Cremer worked with Bodenstein at this time and wrote her dissertation on the hydrogen-chlorine chain reaction in 1927. He explored in great detail the reaction mechanism of reaction between hydrogen and chlorine. With this research, he contributed to the understanding in light-induced chemical chain reactions and thus contributed to the photochemistry. In his kinetic studies, he used the quasi-steady state approximation to derive the rate equation of the reaction. When an overall reaction is subdivided into elementary steps, Bodenstein's quasi-steady state approximation neglects the variations in the concentrations of reaction intermediates by assuming that these will remain quasi-constant. These reactive intermediates can be radicals, carbenium ions, molecules in the excited state, etc.

Victor Henri wrote in 1902: "M. Bodenstein to whom I owe much valuable advice", in particular on the kinetic description of the invertase enzyme. Thus, Bodenstein contributed to early research in enzyme kinetics. According to Henri and a later paper by Bodenstein himself, in 1901 or 1902, he suggested the enzyme-kinetic rate law v = V S / (mS + nP). Henri corrected this into v = V S / (1 + mS + nP) (both written in modern notation; S, substrate concentration, P, product concentration).

The Bodenstein number (Bo), a dimensionless number that is often used to describe axial mixing in so-called axial-dispersion models for tubular reactors, is named after him. It represents the ratio between the convective transport to the transport by axial dispersion.

== Awards and fellowships ==
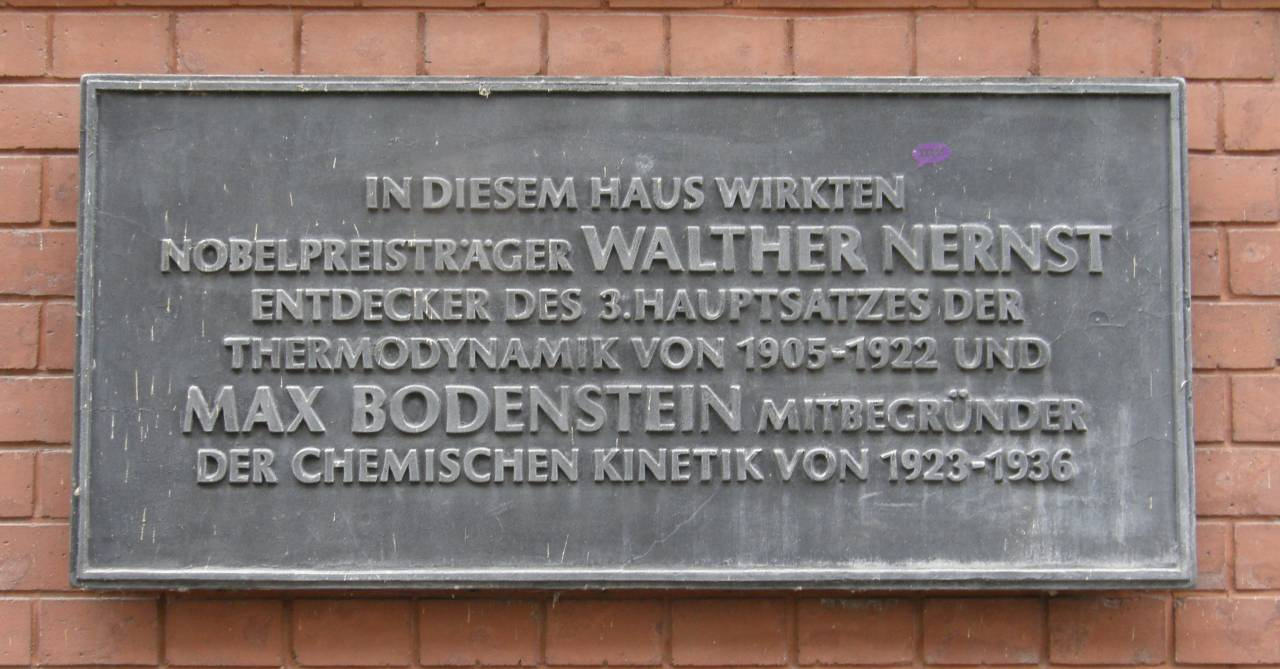
Nernst/Bodenstein commemorative tablet

In 1924, Max Bodenstein became fellow of the Göttingen Academy of Sciences. In 1925, he became fellow of the Prussian Academy of Sciences, and in 1933 fellow of the German Academy of Sciences Leopoldina.

On 21 November 1936, he was awarded the "August Wilhelm von Hofmann votive medal" from the "German Chemical Society" (Deutsche chemische Gesellschaft). In 1942, he also became fellow of the Bavarian Academy of Sciences. Furthermore, he became honorary doctor of science of Princeton University and Dr.-Ing. E.h. (honorary doctor of engineering).

On 13 September 1983, a tablet commemorating Max Bodenstein and Walther Nernst was unveiled at the Physicochemical Institute of the University of Berlin, Bunsenstraße 1, Berlin-Mitte.

== Personal life ==
In 1896, Max Bodenstein married Marie Nebel (17 February 1862 – 8 October 1944), daughter of the lawyer Frederick Nebel and Mary Busch, in Heidelberg. They had two daughters: Hilde (in 1897) and Elsbeth (in 1901).

Max Bodenstein died in Berlin on 3 September 1942. His tomb is at the cemetery Evangelischer Kirchhof Nikolassee, no. J13/14).

== Sources ==
- Chemische Kinetik. Ergebnisse der exakten Naturwiss., Berlin 1922; I., page 197–209
- Photochemie. Ergebnisse der exakten Naturwiss., Berlin 1922; I, page 210–227
- Completed references of his works in the library of Berlin-Brandenburgische Akademie der Wissenschaften
- Completed references of his works in the Wiley Interscience
