= Cohesion number =

Dimensionless number in particle technology

The Cohesion number (Coh) is a useful dimensionless number in particle technology by which the cohesivity of different powders can be compared. This is especially useful in DEM simulations (Discrete Element Method) of granular materials where scaling of the size and stiffness of the particles are inevitable due to the computationally demanding nature of the DEM modelling.

== Background ==
In simulation of granular materials, scaling the particle size with regards to the other particles physical and mechanical properties is a challenging job. Especially in simulation of cohesive powders, lack of a robust criterion for tuning the level of the surface energy of the particles can waste enormous amount of time during the process of calibration. The Bond number has been used traditionally in this regards, where the significance of the adhesive force (pull-off force) is compared with the particles gravitational force (weight); nevertheless, the influence of the materials properties, particularly the particles stiffness, is not comprehensively observed in this number. The particles stiffness, which is not present in the Bond number, has a considerable impact on how particles respond to an applied force. If the forces in the Bond number are substituted with potential and cohesion energies, a new dimensionless number will be formed whereby the effect of the particles stiffness is also considered. This was firstly proposed by Behjani et al. where they introduced a dimensionless number titled as the Cohesion number.

== Definition and mathematical derivations ==
The Cohesion number is a dimensionless number which shows the ratio of the work required for detaching two arbitrary solid particles (work of cohesion) to their gravitational potential energy as expressed below,

$\text{Cohesion number}=\frac{\text{work of cohesion}}{\text{gravitational potential energy}}$

For example, in the JKR contact model the work of cohesion is $7.09\left ( \frac{\Gamma^5{R^*}^4}{{E^*}^2} \right )^{\frac{1}{3}}$ by which the Cohesion number is derived as follows:

$$Coh=\frac{7.09\left ( \frac{\Gamma^5{R^*}^4}{{E^*}^2} \right )^{\frac{1}{3}}}{mgR^*}$$

Mass can be shown in the form of density and volume and the constant number can be eliminated,

$$Coh=\frac{7.09\left ( \frac{\Gamma^5{R^*}^4}{{E^*}^2} \right )^{\frac{1}{3}}}{\rho {R^*}^3 gR^*}$$

The final version of the Cohesion number is as following:

$$Coh=\frac{1}{\rho g}\left ( \frac{\Gamma^5}{{E^*}^2{R^*}^8} \right )^{\frac{1}{3}}$$

$\rho$ is the particle density

$g$ is the gravity

$\Gamma$ is the interfacial energy

$E^*$ is the equivalent Young’s modulus: $E^*=(\frac{1-\nu_{1}^2}{E_{1}}+\frac{1-\nu_{2}^2}{E_{2}})^{-1}$

$\nu$ is the material Poisson's ratio

$R^*$ shows the equivalent radius: $R^*=(\frac{1}{R_{1}}+\frac{1}{R_{2}})^{-1}$

This number is dependent on the particles surface energy, particles size, particle density, gravity, and the Young’s modulus. It well justifies that the materials having lower stiffness become “stickier” if adhesive and it is a useful scaling method for the DEM simulations at which Young’s modulus is selected smaller than the real value in order to increase the computational speed. Recently, a rigorous analysis of the contact stiffness reduction for the adhesive contacts to speed up the DEM calculations shows the same fractional form.

== See also ==
- Contact mechanics
- Surface tension
