= Affine hull =

Smallest affine subspace that contains a subset

In mathematics, the affine hull or affine span of a set $S$ in Euclidean space $\mathbb{R}^n$ is the smallest affine set containing $S$, or equivalently, the intersection of all affine sets containing $S$. Here, an affine set may be defined as the translation of a vector subspace.

The affine hull of $S$ is what $\operatorname{span} S$ would be if the origin was moved to $S$.

The affine hull aff($S$) of $S$ is the set of all affine combinations of elements of $S$, that is,

$$\operatorname{aff} (S)=\left\{\sum_{i=1}^k \alpha_i x_i \, \Bigg | \, k>0, \, x_i\in S, \, \alpha_i\in \mathbb{R}, \, \sum_{i=1}^k \alpha_i=1 \right\}.$$

== Examples ==
- The affine hull of the empty set is the empty set.
- The affine hull of a singleton (a set made of one single element) is the singleton itself.
- The affine hull of a set of two different points is the line through them.
- The affine hull of a set of three points not on one line is the plane going through them.
- The affine hull of a set of four points not in a plane in $\mathbb{R}^3$ is the entire space $\mathbb{R}^3$.

== Properties ==
For any subsets $S, T \subseteq X$

- $\operatorname{aff}(\operatorname{aff} S) = \operatorname{aff} S \subset \operatorname{span} S = \operatorname{span} \operatorname{aff} S$.
- $\operatorname{aff} S$ is a closed set if $X$ is finite dimensional.
- $\operatorname{aff}(S + T)=\operatorname{aff} S + \operatorname{aff} T$.
- $S\subset \operatorname{aff} S$.
- If $0 \in \operatorname{aff} S$ then $\operatorname{aff} S = \operatorname{span} S$.
- If $s_0 \in \operatorname{aff} S$ then $\operatorname{aff}(S) - s_0 = \operatorname{span}(S - s_0)= \operatorname{span}(S - S)$ is a linear subspace of $X$.
- $\operatorname{aff}(S - S) = \operatorname{span}(S - S)$ if $S\ne\varnothing$.
  - So, $\operatorname{aff}(S - S)$ is always a vector subspace of $X$ if $S\ne\varnothing$.
- If $S$ is convex then $\operatorname{aff}(S - S) = \displaystyle\bigcup_{\lambda > 0} \lambda (S - S)$
- For every $s_0 \in \operatorname{aff} S$, $\operatorname{aff} S = s_0 + \operatorname{span}(S - s_0) = s_0 + \operatorname{span}(S - S) = S + \operatorname{span}(S - S) = s_0 + \operatorname{cone}(S - S)$ where $\operatorname{cone}(S - S)$ is the smallest cone containing $S - S$ (here, a set $C \subseteq X$ is a cone if $r c \in C$ for all $c \in C$ and all non-negative $r \geq 0$).
  - Hence $\operatorname{cone}(S - S)= \operatorname{span}(S - S)$ is always a linear subspace of $X$ parallel to $\operatorname{aff} S$ if $S\ne\varnothing$.
  - Note: $\operatorname{aff} S = s_0 + \operatorname{span}(S - s_0)$ says that if we translate $S$ so that it contains the origin, take its span, and translate it back, we get $\operatorname{aff} S$. Moreover, $\operatorname{aff} S$ or $s_0 + \operatorname{span}(S - s_0)$ is what $\operatorname{span} S$ would be if the origin was at $s_0$.

== Related sets ==
- If instead of an affine combination one uses a convex combination, that is, one requires in the formula above that all $\alpha_i$ be non-negative, one obtains the convex hull of $S$, which cannot be larger than the affine hull of $S$, as more restrictions are involved.
- The notion of conical combination gives rise to the notion of the conical hull $\operatorname{cone} S$.
- If however one puts no restrictions at all on the numbers $\alpha_i$, instead of an affine combination one has a linear combination, and the resulting set is the linear span $\operatorname{span} S$ of $S$, which contains the affine hull of $S$.

== Sources ==
- R.J. Webster, Convexity, Oxford University Press, 1994. ISBN 0-19-853147-8.
- Roman, Stephen (2008), Advanced Linear Algebra, Graduate Texts in Mathematics (Third ed.), Springer, ISBN 978-0-387-72828-5
