= Convex combination =

Linear combination of points

Given three points $x_1, x_2, x_3$ in a plane as shown in the figure, the point $P$ is a convex combination of the three points, while $Q$ is not. ($Q$ is however an affine combination of the three points, as their affine hull is the entire plane.)

Convex combination of two points $v_1,v_2 \in \mathbb{R}^2$ in a two dimensional vector space $\mathbb{R}^2$ as animation in Geogebra with $t \in [0,1]$ and $K(t) := (1-t)\cdot v_1 + t \cdot v_2$

Convex combination of three points $v_{0},v_{1},v_{2} \text{ of } 2\text{-simplex} \in \mathbb{R}^{2}$ in a two dimensional vector space $\mathbb{R}^{2}$ as shown in animation with $\alpha^{0}+\alpha^{1}+\alpha^{2}=1$, $P( \alpha^{0},\alpha^{1},\alpha^{2} )$ $:= \alpha^{0} v_{0} + \alpha^{1} v_{1} + \alpha^{2} v_{2}$ . When P is inside of the triangle $\alpha_{i}\ge 0$. Otherwise, when P is outside of the triangle, at least one of the $\alpha_{i}$ is negative.

Convex combination of four points $A_{1},A_{2},A_{3},A_{4} \in \mathbb{R}^{3}$ in a three dimensional vector space $\mathbb{R}^{3}$ as animation in Geogebra with $\sum_{i=1}^{4} \alpha_{i}=1$ and $\sum_{i=1}^{4} \alpha_{i}\cdot A_{i}=P$. When P is inside of the tetrahedron $\alpha_{i}>=0$. Otherwise, when P is outside of the tetrahedron, at least one of the $\alpha_{i}$ is negative.

Convex combination of two functions as vectors in a vector space of functions - visualized in Open Source Geogebra with $[a,b]=[-4,7]$ and as the first function $f:[a,b]\to \mathbb{R}$ a polynomial is defined. $f(x):= \frac{3}{10} \cdot x^2 - 2$ A trigonometric function $g:[a,b]\to \mathbb{R}$ was chosen as the second function. $g(x):= 2 \cdot \cos(x) + 1$ The figure illustrates the convex combination $K(t):= (1-t)\cdot f + t \cdot g$ of $f$ and $g$ as graph in red color.

In convex geometry and vector algebra, a convex combination is a linear combination of points (which can be vectors, scalars, or more generally points in an affine space) where all coefficients are non-negative and sum to 1. In other words, the operation is equivalent to a weighted average, but whose weights are expressed as proportions, instead of freely chosen weights which require dividing by the sum of the weights to find the weighted average.

== Formal definition ==
More formally, given a finite number of points $x_1, x_2, \dots, x_n$ in a real vector space or affine space, a convex combination of these points is a point of the form

$$\alpha_1x_1+\alpha_2x_2+\cdots+\alpha_nx_n$$

where the real numbers $\alpha_i$ satisfy $\alpha_i\ge 0$ and $\alpha_1+\alpha_2+\cdots+\alpha_n=1.$

As a particular example, every convex combination of two points lies on the line segment between the points.

A set is convex if it contains all convex combinations of its points. The convex hull of a given set of points is identical to the set of all their convex combinations.

There exist subsets of a vector space that are not closed under linear combinations but are closed under convex combinations. For example, the interval $[0,1]$ is convex but generates the real-number line under linear combinations. Another example is the convex set of probability distributions, as linear combinations preserve neither nonnegativity nor affinity (i.e., having total integral one).

== Other objects ==
- A random variable $X$ is said to have an $n$-component finite mixture distribution if its probability density function is a convex combination of $n$ so-called component densities.

== Related constructions ==
- A conical combination is a linear combination with nonnegative coefficients. When a point $x$ is to be used as the reference origin for defining displacement vectors, then $x$ is a convex combination of $n$ points $x_1, x_2, \dots, x_n$ if and only if the zero displacement is a non-trivial conical combination of their $n$ respective displacement vectors relative to $x$.
- Weighted means are functionally the same as convex combinations, but they use a different notation. The coefficients (weights) in a weighted mean are not required to sum to 1; instead the weighted linear combination is explicitly divided by the sum of the weights.
- Affine combinations are like convex combinations, but the coefficients are not required to be non-negative. Hence, affine combinations are defined in vector spaces over any field.

== See also ==
- Affine hull
- Carathéodory's theorem (convex hull)
- Simplex
- Barycentric coordinate system
- Convex space
