= Complex affine space =

Affine space over the complex numbers

Affine geometry, broadly speaking, is the study of the geometrical properties of lines, planes, and their higher dimensional analogs, in which a notion of "parallel" is retained, but no metrical notions of distance or angle are. Affine spaces differ from linear spaces (that is, vector spaces) in that they do not have a distinguished choice of origin. So, in the words of Marcel Berger, "An affine space is nothing more than a vector space whose origin we try to forget about, by adding translations to the linear maps." Accordingly, a complex affine space, that is an affine space over the complex numbers, is like a complex vector space, but without a distinguished point to serve as the origin.

Affine geometry is one of the two main branches of classical algebraic geometry, the other being projective geometry. A complex affine space can be obtained from a complex projective space by fixing a hyperplane, which can be thought of as a hyperplane of ideal points "at infinity" of the affine space. To illustrate the difference (over the real numbers), a parabola in the affine plane intersects the line at infinity, whereas an ellipse does not. However, any two conic sections are projectively equivalent. So a parabola and ellipse are the same when thought of projectively, but different when regarded as affine objects. Somewhat less intuitively, over the complex numbers, an ellipse intersects the line at infinity in a pair of points while a parabola intersects the line at infinity in a single point. So, for a slightly different reason, an ellipse and parabola are inequivalent over the complex affine plane but remain equivalent over the (complex) projective plane.

Any complex vector space is an affine space: all one needs to do is forget the origin (and possibly any additional structure such as an inner product). For example, the complex n-space $\mathbb C^n$ can be regarded as a complex affine space, when one is interested only in its affine properties (as opposed to its linear or metrical properties, for example). Since any two affine spaces of the same dimension are isomorphic, in some situations it is appropriate to identify them with $\mathbb C^n$, with the understanding that only affinely-invariant notions are ultimately meaningful. This usage is very common in modern algebraic geometry.

== Affine structure ==
There are several equivalent ways to specify the affine structure of an n-dimensional complex affine space A. The simplest involves an auxiliary space V, called the difference space, which is a vector space over the complex numbers. Then an affine space is a set A together with a simple and transitive action of V on A. (That is, A is a V-torsor.)

Another way is to define a notion of affine combination, satisfying certain axioms. An affine combination of points p_{1}, …, p_{k} ∊ A is expressed as a sum of the form

$$a_1\mathbf p_1+\cdots+a_k\mathbf p_k$$

where the scalars a_{i} are complex numbers that sum to unity.

The difference space can be identified with the set of "formal differences" p − q, modulo the relation that formal differences respect affine combinations in an obvious way.

=== Affine functions ===
A function $f:\mathbf A \mapsto \mathbb C$ is called affine if it preserves affine combinations. So

$$f(a_1\mathbf p_1+\cdots+a_k\mathbf p_k)=a_1f(\mathbf p_1)+\cdots+a_kf(\mathbf p_k)$$

for any affine combination

$a_1\mathbf p_1+\cdots+a_k\mathbf p_k$ in A.

The space of affine functions A* is a linear space. The dual vector space of A* is naturally isomorphic to an (n+1)-dimensional vector space F(A) which is the free vector space on A modulo the relation that affine combination in A agrees with affine combination in F(A). Via this construction, the affine structure of the affine space A can be recovered completely from the space of affine functions.

The algebra of polynomials in the affine functions on A defines a ring of functions, called the affine coordinate ring in algebraic geometry. This ring carries a filtration, by degree in the affine functions. Conversely, it is possible to recover the points of the affine space as the set of algebra homomorphisms from the affine coordinate ring into the complex numbers. This is called the maximal spectrum of the ring, because it coincides with its set of maximal ideals. There is a unique affine structure on this maximal spectrum that is compatible with the filtration on the affine coordinate ring.

== Low-dimensional examples ==
=== One dimension ===
A one-dimensional complex affine space, or complex affine line, is a torsor for a one-dimensional linear space over $\mathbb C$. The simplest example is the Argand plane of complex numbers $\mathbb C$ itself. This has a canonical linear structure, and so "forgetting" the origin gives it a canonical affine structure.

For another example, suppose that X is a two-dimensional vector space over the complex numbers. Let $\alpha:\mathbf X \to \mathbb C$ be a linear functional. It is well known that the set of solutions of α(x) = 0, the kernel of α, is a one-dimensional linear subspace (that is, a complex line through the origin of X). But if c is some non-zero complex number, then the set A of solutions of α(x) = c is an affine line in X, but it is not a linear subspace because it is not closed under arbitrary linear combination. The difference space V is the kernel of α, because the difference of two solutions of the inhomogeneous equation α(x) = c lies in the kernel.

An analogous construction applies to the solution of first order linear ordinary differential equations. The solutions of the homogeneous differential equation

$$y'(x) + \mu(x)y(x) = 0$$

is a one-dimensional linear space, whereas the set of solutions of the inhomogeneous problem

$$y'(x) + \mu(x)y(x) = f(x)$$

is a one-dimensional affine space A. The general solution is equal to a particular solution of the equation, plus a solution of the homogeneous equation. The space of solutions of the homogeneous equation is the difference space V.

Consider once more the general the case of a two-dimensional vector space X equipped with a linear form α. An affine space A(c) is given by the solution α(x) = c. Observe that, for two difference non-zero values of c, say c_{1} and c_{2}, the affine spaces A(c_{1}) and A(c_{2}) are naturally isomorphic: scaling by c_{2}/c_{1} maps A(c_{1}) to A(c_{2}). So there is really only one affine space worth considering in this situation, call it A, whose points are the lines through the origin of X that do not lie on the kernel of α.

Algebraically, the complex affine space A just described is the space of splittings of the exact sequence

$$0 \to \ker\alpha \, \overset{\subseteq}{\rightarrow} \, X \xrightarrow{\alpha} \mathbb C \to 0.$$

=== Two dimensions ===
A complex affine plane is a two-dimensional affine space over the complex numbers. An example is the two-dimensional complex coordinate space $\mathbb C^2$. This has a natural linear structure, and so inherits an affine structure under the forgetful functor. Another example is the set of solutions of a second-order inhomogeneous linear ordinary differential equation (over the complex numbers). Finally, in analogy with the one-dimensional case, the space of splittings of an exact sequence

$$0 \to \mathbb C^2 \to \mathbb C^3 \to \mathbb C \to 0$$

is an affine space of dimension two.

=== Four dimensions ===
The conformal spin group of the Lorentz group is SU(2,2), which acts on a four dimensional complex vector space T (called twistor space). The conformal Poincaré group, as a subgroup of SU(2,2), stabilizes an exact sequence of the form

$$0\to\Pi\to\mathbf T\to \Omega\to 0$$

where Π is a maximal isotropic subspace of T. The space of splittings of this sequence is a four-dimensional affine space: (complexified) Minkowski space.

== Affine coordinates ==
Let A be an n-dimensional affine space. A collection of n affinely independent affine functions $z_1,z_2,\dots,z_n : \mathbf A \to \mathbb C$ is an affine coordinate system on A. An affine coordinate system on A sets up a bijection of A with the complex coordinate space $\mathbb C^n$, whose elements are n-tuples of complex numbers.

Conversely, $\mathbb C^n$ is sometimes referred to as complex affine n-space, where it is understood that it is its structure as an affine space (as opposed, for instance, to its status as a linear space or as a coordinate space) that is of interest. Such a usage is typical in algebraic geometry.

== Associated projective space ==
A complex affine space A has a canonical projective completion P(A), defined as follows. Form the vector space F(A) which is the free vector space on A modulo the relation that affine combination in F(A) agrees with affine combination in A. Then dim F(A) = n + 1, where n is the dimension of A. The projective completion of A is the projective space of one-dimensional complex linear subspaces of F(A).

== Structure group and automorphisms ==
The group Aut(P(A)) = PGL(F(A)) ≅ PGL(n + 1, C) acts on P(A). The stabilizer of the hyperplane at infinity is a parabolic subgroup, which is the automorphism group of A. It is isomorphic (but not naturally isomorphic) to a semidirect product of the group GL(V) and V. The subgroup GL(V) is the stabilizer of some fixed reference point o (an "origin") in A, acting as the linear automorphism group of the space of vector emanating from o, and V acts by translation.

The automorphism group of the projective space P(A) as an algebraic variety is none other than the group of collineations PGL(F(A)). In contrast, the automorphism group of the affine space A as an algebraic variety is much larger. For example, consider the self-map of the affine plane defined in terms of a pair of affine coordinates by

$$(z_1,z_2) \mapsto (z_1,z_2+f(z_1))$$

where f is a polynomial in a single variable. This is an automorphism of the algebraic variety, but not an automorphism of the affine structure. The Jacobian determinant of such an algebraic automorphism is necessarily a non-zero constant. It is believed that if the Jacobian of a self-map of a complex affine space is non-zero constant, then the map is an (algebraic) automorphism. This is known as the Jacobian conjecture.

== Complex structure ==
A function on complex affine space is holomorphic if its complex conjugate is Lie derived along the difference space V. This gives any complex affine space the structure of a complex manifold.

Every affine function from A to the complex numbers is holomorphic. Hence, so is every polynomial in affine functions.

== Topologies ==
There are two topologies on a complex affine space that are commonly used.

The analytic topology is the initial topology for the family of affine functions into the complex numbers, where the complex numbers carry their usual Euclidean topology induced by the complex absolute value as norm. This is also the initial topology for the family of holomorphic functions.

The analytic topology has a base consisting of polydiscs. Associated to any n independent affine functions $z_1,\dots,z_n:\mathbf A\to \mathbb C$ on A, the unit polydisc is defined by

$$B ( z_1 , \dots , z_n ) = \left\{ \mathbf{z} \in \mathbf{A} \, : \, \left| z_1 ( \mathbf z ) \right| < 1 , \dots, \left| z_n ( \mathbf z ) \right| < 1 \right\} .$$

Any open set in the analytic topology is the union of a countable collection of unit polydiscs.

The Zariski topology is the initial topology for the affine complex-valued functions, but giving the complex line the finite-complement topology instead. So in the Zariski topology, a subset of A is closed if and only if it is the zero set of some collection of complex-valued polynomial functions on A. A subbase of the Zariski topology is the collection of complements of irreducible algebraic sets.

The analytic topology is finer than the Zariski topology, meaning that every set that is open in the Zariski topology is also open in the analytic topology. The converse is not true. A polydisc, for example, is open in the analytic topology but not the Zariski topology.

A metric can be defined on a complex affine space, making it a Euclidean space, by selecting an inner product on V. The distance between two points p and q of A is then given in terms of the associated norm on V by

$$d(\mathbf p , \mathbf q) = \left\| \mathbf p - \mathbf q \right\| .$$

The open balls associated to the metric form a basis for a topology, which is the same as the analytic topology.

== Sheaf of analytic functions ==
The family of holomorphic functions on a complex affine space A forms a sheaf of rings on it. By definition, such a sheaf associates to each (analytic) open subset U of A the ring $\mathcal{O}(U)$ of all complex-valued holomorphic functions on U.

The uniqueness of analytic continuation says that given two holomorphic functions on a connected open subset U of C^{n}, if they coincide on a nonempty open subset of U, they agree on U. In terms of sheaf theory, the uniqueness implies that $\mathcal{O}$, when viewed as étalé space, is a Hausdorff topological space.

Oka's coherence theorem states that the structure sheaf $\mathcal{O}$ of a complex affine space is coherent. This is the fundamental result in the function theory of several complex variables; for instance it immediately implies that the structure sheaf of a complex-analytic space (e.g., a complex manifold) is coherent.

Every complex affine space is a domain of holomorphy. In particular, it is a Stein manifold.

== See also ==
- Analytic space
- Complex coordinate space
- Complex polytope
- Exotic affine space
