= Complex coordinate space =

Space formed by the n-tuples of complex numbers

In mathematics, the n-dimensional complex coordinate space (or complex n-space) is the set of all ordered n-tuples of complex numbers, also known as complex vectors. The space is denoted $\Complex^n$, and is the n-fold Cartesian product of the complex line $\Complex$ with itself. Symbolically,
$$\Complex^n = \left\{ (z_1,\dots,z_n) \mid z_1, \dots, z_n \in \Complex\right\}$$
or
$$\Complex^n = \underbrace{\Complex \times \Complex \times \cdots \times \Complex}_{n}.$$
The variables $z_i$ are the (complex) coordinates on the complex n-space. The special case $\Complex^2$, called the complex coordinate plane, is not to be confused with the complex plane, a graphical representation of the complex line.

Complex coordinate space is a vector space over the complex numbers, with componentwise addition and scalar multiplication. The real and imaginary parts of the coordinates set up a bijection of $\Complex^n$ with the 2n-dimensional real coordinate space, $\mathbb R^{2n}$. With the standard Euclidean topology, $\Complex^n$ is a topological vector space over the complex numbers.

A function on an open subset of complex n-space is holomorphic if it is holomorphic in each complex coordinate separately. Several complex variables is the study of such holomorphic functions in n variables. More generally, the complex n-space is the target space for holomorphic coordinate systems on complex manifolds.

== See also ==
- Complex affine space
- Coordinate space
