= Skew coordinates =

Curvilinear coordinate system

A system of skew coordinates, sometimes called oblique coordinates, is a curvilinear coordinate system where the coordinate surfaces are not orthogonal, as in orthogonal coordinates.

Skew coordinates tend to be more complicated to work with compared to orthogonal coordinates since the metric tensor will have nonzero off-diagonal components, preventing many simplifications in formulas for tensor algebra and tensor calculus. The nonzero off-diagonal components of the metric tensor are a direct result of the non-orthogonality of the basis vectors of the coordinates, since by definition:

$$g_{i j} = \mathbf e_i \cdot \mathbf e_j$$

where $g_{i j}$ is the metric tensor and $\mathbf e_i$ the (covariant) basis vectors.

These coordinate systems can be useful if the geometry of a problem fits well into a skewed system. For example, solving Laplace's equation in a parallelogram will be easiest when done in appropriately skewed coordinates.

== Cartesian coordinates with one skewed axis ==
A coordinate system where the x axis has been bent toward the z axis

The simplest 3D case of a skew coordinate system modifies a Cartesian coordinate system into an affine coordinate system by rotating one of the axes (say the x axis) by some angle $\phi$, while staying orthogonal to one of the remaining two axes. For this example, the x axis of a Cartesian coordinate has been bent toward the z axis by $\phi$, remaining orthogonal to the y axis.

=== Algebra and useful quantities ===
Let $\mathbf e_1$, $\mathbf e_2$, and $\mathbf e_3$ respectively be unit vectors along the $x$, $y$, and $z$ axes. These represent the covariant basis; computing their dot products gives the metric tensor:

$$[g_{ij}] =
\begin{pmatrix}
1&0&\sin(\phi)\\
0&1&0\\
\sin(\phi)&0&1
\end{pmatrix}
,\qquad
[g^{ij}] = \frac{1}{\cos^2(\phi)}
\begin{pmatrix}
1&0&-\sin(\phi)\\
0&\cos^2(\phi)&0\\
-\sin(\phi)&0&1
\end{pmatrix}$$

where

$$\quad g_{13} = \cos\left(\frac \pi 2 - \phi\right) = \sin(\phi)$$

and

$$\sqrt{g} = \mathbf e_1 \cdot (\mathbf e_2 \times \mathbf e_3) = \cos(\phi)$$

which are quantities that will be useful later on.

The contravariant basis is given by

$$\mathbf e^1 = \frac{\mathbf e_2 \times \mathbf e_3}{\sqrt{g}} = \frac{\mathbf e_2 \times \mathbf e_3}{\cos(\phi)}$$

$$\mathbf e^2 = \frac{\mathbf e_3 \times \mathbf e_1}{\sqrt{g}} = \mathbf e_2$$

$$\mathbf e^3 = \frac{\mathbf e_1 \times \mathbf e_2}{\sqrt{g}} = \frac{\mathbf e_1 \times \mathbf e_2}{\cos(\phi)}$$

The contravariant basis isn't a very convenient one to use, however it shows up in definitions so must be considered. We'll favor writing quantities with respect to the covariant basis.

Since the basis vectors are all constant, vector addition and subtraction will simply be familiar component-wise adding and subtraction. Now, let

$$\mathbf a = \sum_i a^i \mathbf e_i \quad \mbox{and} \quad \mathbf b = \sum_i b^i \mathbf e_i$$

where the sums indicate summation over all values of the index (in this case, i = 1, 2, 3). The contravariant and covariant components of these vectors may be related by

$$a^i = \sum_j a_j g^{ij}$$

so that, explicitly,

$$a^1 = \frac{a_1 - \sin(\phi) a_3}{\cos^2(\phi)},$$

$$a^2 = a_2,$$

$$a^3 = \frac{-\sin(\phi) a_1 + a_3}{\cos^2(\phi)}.$$

The dot product in terms of contravariant components is then

$$\mathbf a \cdot \mathbf b = \sum_i a^i b_i = a^1 b^1 + a^2 b^2 + a^3 b^3 + \sin(\phi) (a^1 b^3 + a^3 b^1)$$

and in terms of covariant components

$$\mathbf a \cdot \mathbf b = \frac{1}{\cos^2(\phi)} [ a_1 b_1 + a_2 b_2\cos^2(\phi) + a_3 b_3 - \sin(\phi) (a_1 b_3 + a_3 b_1) ].$$

=== Calculus ===
By definition, the gradient of a scalar function f is

$$\nabla f = \sum_i \mathbf e^i \frac{\partial f}{\partial q^i} = \frac{\partial f}{\partial x} \mathbf e^1 + \frac{\partial f}{\partial y} \mathbf e^2 + \frac{\partial f}{\partial z} \mathbf e^3$$

where $q_i$ are the coordinates x, y, z indexed. Recognizing this as a vector written in terms of the contravariant basis, it may be rewritten:

$$\nabla f =
\frac{\frac{\partial f}{\partial x} - \sin(\phi) \frac{\partial f}{\partial z}}{\cos(\phi)^2} \mathbf e_1 +
\frac{\partial f}{\partial y} \mathbf e_2 +
\frac{-\sin(\phi) \frac{\partial f}{\partial x} + \frac{\partial f}{\partial z}}{\cos(\phi)^2} \mathbf e_3.$$

The divergence of a vector $\mathbf a$ is

$$\nabla \cdot \mathbf a = \frac{1}{\sqrt{g}} \sum_i \frac{\partial}{\partial q^i}\left(\sqrt{g} a^i\right) = \frac{\partial a^1}{\partial x} + \frac{\partial a^2}{\partial y} + \frac{\partial a^3}{\partial z}.$$

and of a tensor $\mathbf A$

$$\nabla \cdot \mathbf A = \frac{1}{\sqrt{g}} \sum_{i, j} \frac{\partial}{\partial q^i}\left(\sqrt{g} a^{ij} \mathbf e_j\right) =
\sum_{i, j} \mathbf e_j \frac{\partial a^{ij}}{\partial q^i}.$$

The Laplacian of f is

$$\nabla^2 f = \nabla \cdot \nabla f =
\frac{1}{\cos(\phi)^2}\left(\frac{\partial^2 f}{\partial x^2} + \frac{\partial^2 f}{\partial z^2} - 2 \sin(\phi) \frac{\partial^2 f}{\partial x \partial z}\right) + \frac{\partial^2 f}{\partial y^2}$$

and, since the covariant basis is normal and constant, the vector Laplacian is the same as the componentwise Laplacian of a vector written in terms of the covariant basis.

While both the dot product and gradient are somewhat messy in that they have extra terms (compared to a Cartesian system) the advection operator which combines a dot product with a gradient turns out very simple:

$$(\mathbf a \cdot \nabla) = \biggl(\sum_i a^i e_i\biggr) \cdot \biggl(\sum_i \frac{\partial}{\partial q^i} \mathbf e^i\biggr) = \biggl(\sum_i a^i \frac{\partial}{\partial q^i}\biggr)$$

which may be applied to both scalar functions and vector functions, componentwise when expressed in the covariant basis.

Finally, the curl of a vector is

$\nabla \times \mathbf a = \sum_{i, j, k} \mathbf e_k \epsilon^{ijk} \frac{\partial a_j}{\partial q^i} =$

$$\frac{1}{\cos(\phi)}\left(
\left(\sin(\phi) \frac{\partial a^1}{\partial y} + \frac{\partial a^3}{\partial y} - \frac{\partial a^2}{\partial z}\right) \mathbf e_1 +
\left(\frac{\partial a^1}{\partial z} + \sin(\phi) \left(\frac{\partial a^3}{\partial z} - \frac{\partial a^1}{\partial x}\right) - \frac{\partial a^3}{\partial x}\right) \mathbf e_2 +
\left(\frac{\partial a^2}{\partial x} - \frac{\partial a^1}{\partial y} - \sin(\phi) \frac{\partial a^3}{\partial y}\right) \mathbf e_3
\right).$$

== See also ==
- Affine coordinates, with skew and straight-line axes
