= Affine combination =

Linear combination whose coefficients sum to 1

In mathematics, an affine combination of x_{1}, ..., x_{n} is a linear combination

$$\sum_{i=1}^{n}{\alpha_{i} \cdot x_{i}} = \alpha_{1} x_{1} + \alpha_{2} x_{2} + \cdots +\alpha_{n} x_{n},$$

such that

$$\sum_{i=1}^{n} {\alpha_{i}}=1.$$

Here, x_{1}, ..., x_{n} can be elements (vectors) of a vector space over a field K, and the coefficients $\alpha_{i}$ are elements of K.

The elements x_{1}, ..., x_{n} can also be points of a Euclidean space, and, more generally, of an affine space over a field K. In this case the $\alpha_{i}$ are elements of K (or $\mathbb R$ for a Euclidean space), and the affine combination is also a point. See Affine space § Affine combinations and barycenter for the definition in this case.

This concept is fundamental in Euclidean geometry and affine geometry, because the set of all affine combinations of a set of points forms the smallest affine space containing the points, exactly as the linear combinations of a set of vectors form their linear span.

The affine combinations commute with any affine transformation T in the sense that

$$T\sum_{i=1}^{n}{\alpha_{i} \cdot x_{i}} = \sum_{i=1}^{n}{\alpha_{i} \cdot Tx_{i}}.$$

In particular, any affine combination of the fixed points of a given affine transformation $T$ is also a fixed point of $T$, so the set of fixed points of $T$ forms an affine space (in 3D: a line or a plane, and the trivial cases, a point or the whole space).

When a stochastic matrix, A, acts on a column vector, b→, the result is a column vector whose entries are affine combinations of b→ with coefficients from the rows in A.

== See also ==
=== Related combinations ===
- Convex combination
- Conical combination
- Linear combination

=== Affine geometry ===
- Affine space
- Affine geometry
- Affine hull
