= Koras–Russell cubic threefold =

In algebraic geometry, the Koras–Russell cubic threefolds are smooth affine complex threefolds diffeomorphic to $\mathbf{C}^3$studied by Koras & Russell (1997). They have a hyperbolic action of a one-dimensional torus $\mathbf{C}^*$with a unique fixed point, such that the quotients of the threefold and the tangent space of the fixed point by this action are isomorphic. They were discovered in the process of proving the Linearization Conjecture in dimension 3. A linear action of $\mathbf{C}^*$ on the affine space $\mathbf{A}^n$ is one of the form $t*(x_1,\ldots,x_n)=(t^{a_1}x_1,t^{a_2}x_2,\ldots,t^{a_n}x_n)$, where $a_1,\ldots,a_n\in \mathbf{Z}$ and $t\in\mathbf{C}^*$. The Linearization Conjecture in dimension $n$ says that every algebraic action of $\mathbf{C}^*$ on the complex affine space $\mathbf{A}^n$ is linear in some algebraic coordinates on $\mathbf{A}^n$. M. Koras and P. Russell made a key step towards the solution in dimension 3, providing a list of threefolds (now called Koras-Russell threefolds) and proving that the Linearization Conjecture for $n=3$ holds if all those threefolds are exotic affine 3-spaces, that is, none of them is isomorphic to $\mathbf{A}^3$. This was later shown by Kaliman and Makar-Limanov using the ML-invariant of an affine variety, which had been invented exactly for this purpose.

Earlier than the above referred paper, Russell noticed that the hypersurface $R=\{x+x^2y+z^2+t^3=0\}$ has properties very similar to the affine 3-space like contractibility and was interested in distinguishing them as algebraic varieties. This now follows from the computation that $ML(R)=\mathbf{C}[x]$ and $ML(\mathbf{A}^3)=\mathbf{C}$.

== Sources ==
- Koras, M.; Russell, Peter (1997), "Contractible threefolds and C^{*}-actions on C^{3}", Journal of Algebraic Geometry, 6 (4): 671–695, ISSN 1056-3911, MR 1487230, Zbl 0882.14013
