= Convex cone =

Mathematical set closed under positive linear combinations

A convex cone (light blue). Inside of it, the light red convex cone consists of all points αx + βy with α, β > 0, for the depicted x and y. The curves on the upper right symbolize that the regions are infinite in extent.

In linear algebra, a cone—sometimes called a linear cone to distinguish it from other sorts of cones—is a subset of a real vector space that is closed under positive scalar multiplication; that is, $C$ is a cone if $x\in C$ implies $sx\in C$ for every positive scalar $s$. This is a broad generalization of the standard cone in Euclidean space.

A convex cone is a cone that is also closed under addition, or, equivalently, a subset of a vector space that is closed under linear combinations with positive coefficients. It follows that convex cones are convex sets.

The definition of a convex cone makes sense in a vector space over any ordered field, although the field of real numbers is used most often.

== Definition ==
A subset $C$ of a vector space is a cone if $x\in C$ implies $sx\in C$ for every $s>0$. Here $s>0$ refers to (strict) positivity in the scalar field.

=== Competing definitions ===
Some other authors require $[0,\infty)C\subset C$ or even $0\in C$. Some require a cone to be convex and/or satisfy $C\cap-C\subset\{0\}$.

The conical hull of a set $C$ is defined as the smallest convex cone that contains $C\cup\{0\}$. Therefore, it need not be the smallest cone that contains $C\cup\{0\}$.

Wedge may refer to what we call cones (when "cone" is reserved for something stronger), or just to a subset of them, depending on the author.

=== Cone: 0 or not ===
A subset $C$ of a vector space $V$ over an ordered field $F$ is a cone (or sometimes called a linear cone) if for each $x$ in $C$ and positive scalar $\alpha$ in $F$, the product $\alpha x$ is in $C$. Note that some authors define cone with the scalar $\alpha$ ranging over all non-negative scalars (rather than all positive scalars, which does not include 0). Some authors even require $0\in C$, thus excluding the empty set.

Therefore, $[0,\infty)$ is a cone, $\varnothing$ is a cone only according to the 1st and 2nd definition above, and $(0,\infty)$ is a cone only according to the 1st definition above. All of them are convex (see below).

=== Convex cone ===
A cone $C$ is a convex cone if $\alpha x+\beta y$ belongs to $C$, for any positive scalars $\alpha$, $\beta$, and any $x$, $y$ in $C$. A cone $C$ is convex if and only if $C+C\subseteq C$.

This concept is meaningful for any vector space that allows the concept of "positive" scalar, such as spaces over the rational, algebraic, or (more commonly) the real numbers. Also note that the scalars in the definition are positive meaning that the origin does not have to belong to $C$. Some authors use a definition that ensures the origin belongs to $C$. Because of the scaling parameters $\alpha$ and $\beta$, cones are infinite in extent and not bounded.

If $C$ is a convex cone, then for any positive scalar $\alpha$ and any $x$ in $C$ the vector $\alpha x = \tfrac{\alpha}{2}x + \tfrac{\alpha}{2}x \in C.$ So a convex cone is a special case of a linear cone as defined above.

It follows from the above property that a convex cone can also be defined as a linear cone that is closed under convex combinations, or just under addition. More succinctly, a set $C$ is a convex cone if and only if $\alpha C=C$ for every positive scalar $\alpha$ and $C+C=C$.

=== Face of a convex cone ===
A face of a convex cone $C$ is a subset $F$ of $C$ such that $F$ is also a convex cone, and for any vectors $x,y$ in $C$ with $x+y$ in $F$, $x$ and $y$ must both be in $F$. For example, $C$ itself is a face of $C$. The origin $\{ 0\}$ is a face of $C$ if $C$ contains no line (so $C$ is "strictly convex", or "salient", as defined below). The origin and $C$ are sometimes called the trivial faces of $C$. A ray (the set of nonnegative multiples of a nonzero vector) is called an extremal ray if it is a face of $C$.

Let $C$ be a closed, strictly convex cone in $\R^n$. Suppose that $C$ is more than just the origin. Then $C$ is the convex hull of its extremal rays.

== Examples ==
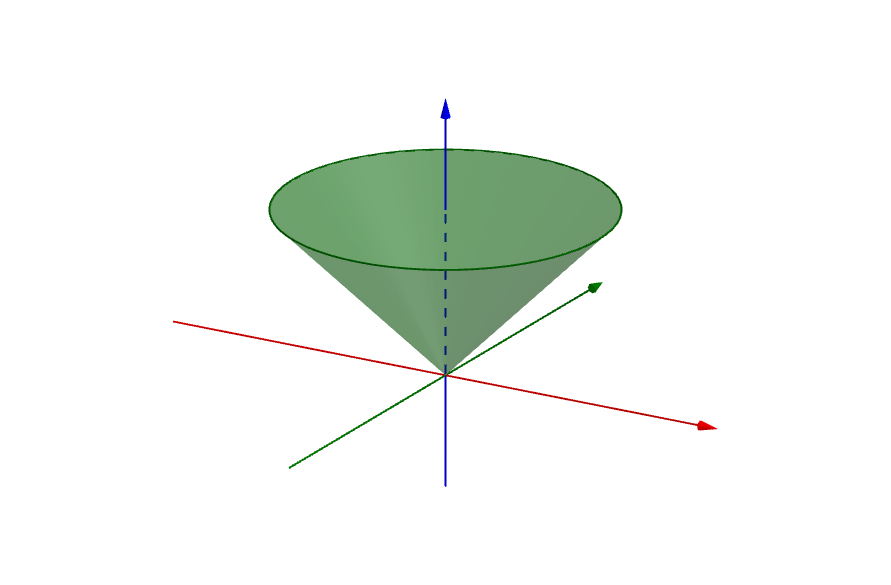
Convex cone that is not a conic hull of finitely many generators.

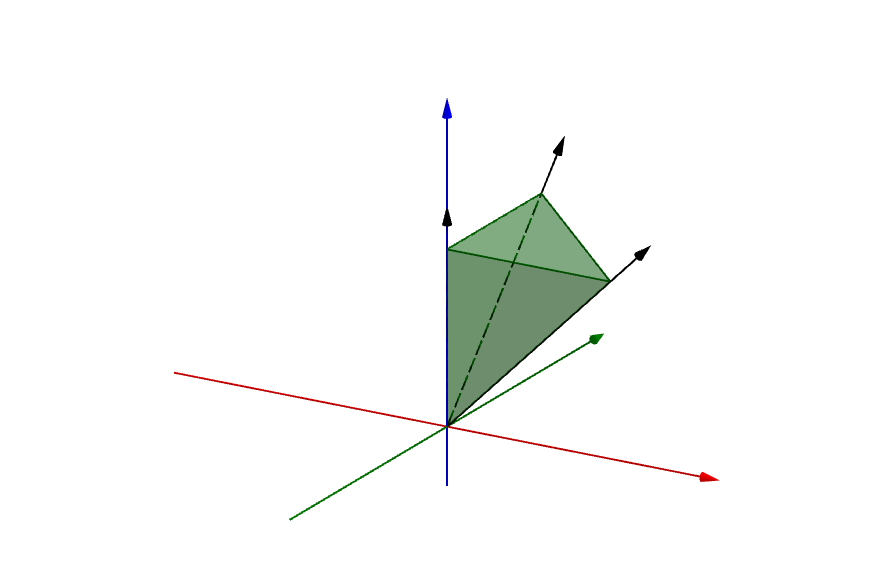
Convex cone generated by the conic combination of the three black vectors.

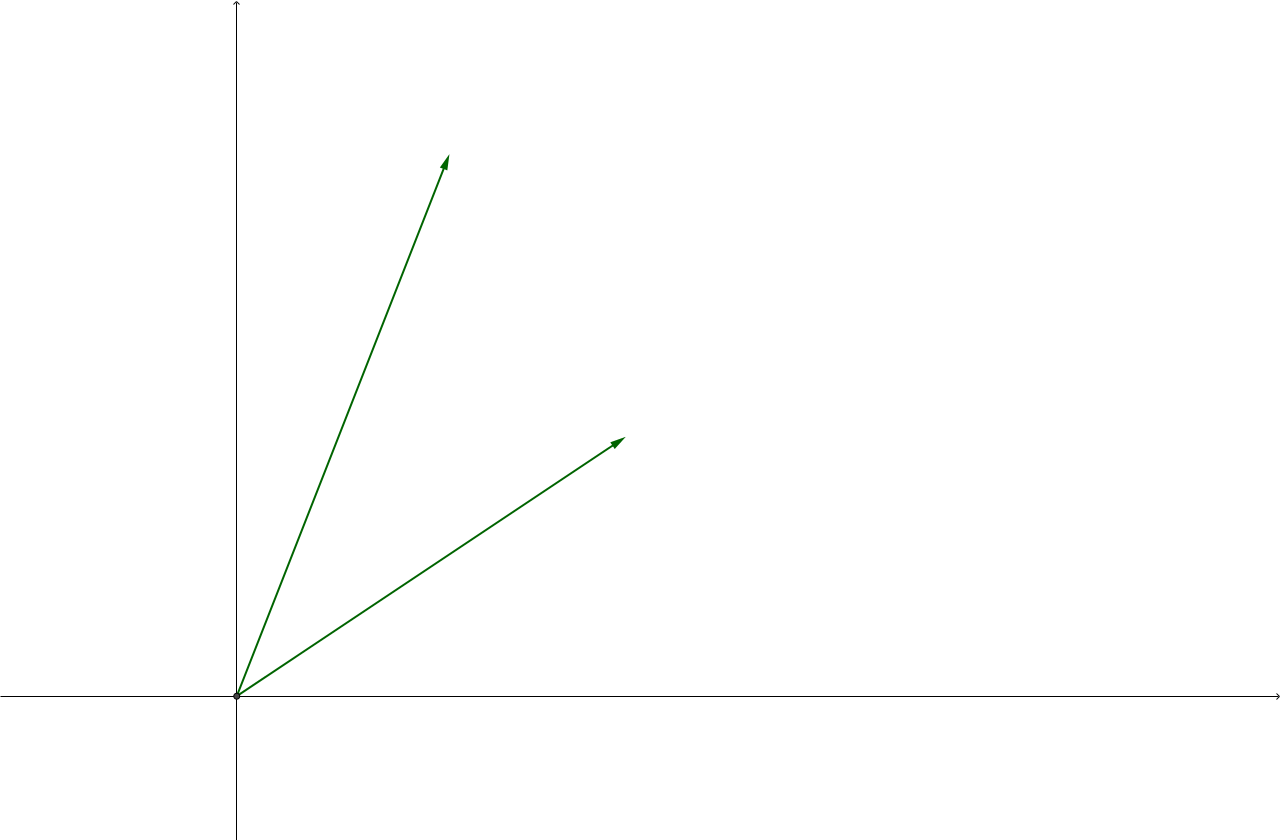
A cone (the union of two rays) that is not a convex cone.

- For a vector space $V$, every linear subspace of $V$ is a convex cone. In particular, the space $V$ itself and the origin $\{ 0\}$ are convex cones in $V$. For authors who do not require a convex cone to contain the origin, the empty set $\emptyset$ is also a convex cone.
- The conical hull of a finite or infinite set of vectors in $\R^n$ is a convex cone.
- The tangent cones of a convex set are convex cones.
- The set
  $$\left \{ x \in \R^2 \mid x_2 \geq 0, x_1 = 0 \right \} \cup \left \{ x \in \R^2 \mid x_1 \geq 0, x_2 = 0 \right \}$$
  is a cone but not a convex cone.
- The norm cone
  $$C = \left \{ (x, r) \in \R^{d+1} \mid \|x\| \leq r \right \}$$
  is a convex cone. (For $d=2$, this is the round cone in the figure.) Each extremal ray of $C$ is spanned by a vector $(x,1)$ with $\|x\|=1$ (so $x$ is a point in the sphere $S^{d-1}$). These rays are in fact the only nontrivial faces of $C$.
- The intersection of two convex cones in the same vector space is again a convex cone, but their union may fail to be one.
- The class of convex cones is also closed under arbitrary linear maps. In particular, if $C$ is a convex cone, so is its opposite $-C$, and $C \cap -C$ is the largest linear subspace contained in $C$.
- The set of positive semidefinite matrices.
- The set of nonnegative continuous functions is a convex cone.

== Special examples ==
=== Affine convex cones ===
An affine convex cone is the set resulting from applying an affine transformation to a convex cone. A common example is translating a convex cone by a point p: p + C. Technically, such transformations can produce non-cones. For example, unless p = 0, p + C is not a linear cone. However, it is still called an affine convex cone.

=== Half-spaces ===
A (linear) hyperplane is a set in the form $\{ x \in V \mid f(x) = c\}$ where f is a linear functional on the vector space V. A closed half-space is a set in the form $\{ x \in V \mid f(x) \leq c\}$ or $\{ x \in V \mid f(x) \geq c\},$ and likewise an open half-space uses strict inequality.

Half-spaces (open or closed) are affine convex cones. Moreover (in finite dimensions), any convex cone C that is not the whole space V must be contained in some closed half-space H of V; this is a special case of Farkas' lemma.

=== Polyhedral and finitely generated cones ===
Polyhedral cones are special kinds of cones that can be defined in several ways:

- A cone $C$ is polyhedral if it is the conical hull of finitely many vectors (this property is also called finitely-generated). I.e., there is a set of vectors $\{v_1, \ldots, v_k\}\subset \R^n$ so that $C = \{ a_1 v_1 + \cdots + a_kv_k \mid a_i \in \R_{\ge 0}\}$.
- A cone is polyhedral if it is the intersection of a finite number of half-spaces which have 0 on their boundary (the equivalence between these first two definitions was proved by Weyl in 1935).
- A cone $C$ is polyhedral if there is some matrix $A\in \R^{m\times n}$ such that $C = \{x \in \R^n \mid Ax \geq 0 \}$.
- A cone is polyhedral if it is the solution set of a system of homogeneous linear inequalities. Algebraically, each inequality is defined by a row of the matrix $A$. Geometrically, each inequality defines a halfspace that passes through the origin.

Every finitely generated cone is a polyhedral cone, and every polyhedral cone is a finitely generated cone. Every polyhedral cone has a unique representation as a conical hull of its extremal generators, and a unique representation of intersections of halfspaces, given each linear form associated with the halfspaces also define a support hyperplane of a facet.

Each face of a polyhedral cone is spanned by some subset of its extremal generators. As a result, a polyhedral cone has only finitely many faces.

Polyhedral cones play a central role in the representation theory of polyhedra. For instance, the decomposition theorem for polyhedra states that every polyhedron can be written as the Minkowski sum of a convex polytope and a polyhedral cone. Polyhedral cones also play an important part in proving the related Finite Basis Theorem for polytopes which shows that every polytope is a polyhedron and every bounded polyhedron is a polytope.

The two representations of a polyhedral cone - by inequalities and by vectors - may have very different sizes. For example, consider the cone of all non-negative $n$-by-$n$ matrices with equal row and column sums. The inequality representation requires $n^2$ inequalities and $2n-1$ equations, but the vector representation requires $n!$ vectors (see the Birkhoff-von Neumann Theorem). The opposite can also happen - the number of vectors may be polynomial while the number of inequalities is exponential.

The two representations together provide an efficient way to decide whether a given vector is in the cone: to show that it is in the cone, it is sufficient to present it as a conic combination of the defining vectors; to show that it is not in the cone, it is sufficient to present a single defining inequality that it violates. This fact is known as Farkas' lemma.

A subtle point in the representation by vectors is that the number of vectors may be exponential in the dimension, so the proof that a vector is in the cone might be exponentially long. Fortunately, Carathéodory's theorem guarantees that every vector in the cone can be represented by at most $d$ defining vectors, where $d$ is the dimension of the space.

=== Blunt, pointed, flat, salient, and proper cones ===
According to the above definition, if C is a convex cone, then C ∪ {0} is a convex cone, too. A convex cone is said to be pointed if 0 is in C, and blunt if 0 is not in C. Some authors use "pointed" for $C\cap-C=\{0\}$ or salient (see below).

Blunt cones can be excluded from the definition of convex cone by substituting "non-negative" for "positive" in the condition of α, β.

A cone is called flat if it contains some nonzero vector x and its opposite −x, meaning C contains a linear subspace of dimension at least one, and salient (or strictly convex) otherwise. A blunt convex cone is necessarily salient, but the converse is not necessarily true. A convex cone C is salient if and only if C ∩ −C ⊆ {0}. A cone C is said to be generating if $C-C=\{x-y\mid x\in C, y\in C\}$ equals the whole vector space.

Some authors require salient cones to be pointed. The term "pointed" is also often used to refer to a closed cone that contains no complete line (i.e., no nontrivial subspace of the ambient vector space V, or what is called a salient cone). The term proper (convex) cone is variously defined, depending on the context and author. It often means a cone that satisfies other properties like being convex, closed, pointed, salient, and full-dimensional. Because of these varying definitions, the context or source should be consulted for the definition of these terms.

=== Rational cones ===
A type of cone of particular interest to pure mathematicians is the partially ordered set of rational cones. "Rational cones are important objects in toric algebraic geometry, combinatorial commutative algebra, geometric combinatorics, integer programming.". This object arises when we study cones in $\R^d$ together with the lattice $\Z^d$. A cone is called rational (here we assume "pointed", as defined above) whenever its generators all have integer coordinates, i.e., if $C$ is a rational cone, then $C = \{ a_1 v_1 + \cdots + a_k v_k \mid a_i \in \R_+ \}$ for some $v_i \in \Z^d$.

== Dual cone ==
Consider a real vector space V equipped with an inner product $\langle \cdot, \cdot\rangle.$ Let C ⊂ V be a set (not necessarily convex). The (continuous or topological) dual cone to C is the set

$$C^* = \{ v \in V \mid \forall w\in C,~\langle w,v \rangle \ge 0 \}.$$

The set $C^*$ is always a convex cone, even if $C$ is neither convex nor a cone.

More generally, the (algebraic) dual cone to C ⊂ V in a linear space V is a subset of the dual space V* defined by:

$$C^* := \left \{ v\in V^* \mid \forall w\in C,~v(w) \ge 0 \right \}.$$

In other words, if V* is the algebraic dual space of V, C* is the set of linear functionals that are nonnegative on the primal cone C. If we take V* to be the continuous dual space then it is the set of continuous linear functionals nonnegative on C. This notion does not require the specification of an inner product on V.

In finite dimensions, the two notions of dual cone are essentially the same because every finite dimensional linear functional is continuous, and every continuous linear functional in an inner product space induces a linear isomorphism (nonsingular linear map) from V* to V, and this isomorphism will take the dual cone given by the second definition, in V*, onto the one given by the first definition; see the Riesz representation theorem.

If C is equal to its dual cone, then C is called self-dual. A cone can be said to be self-dual without reference to any given inner product, if there exists an inner product with respect to which it is equal to its dual by the first definition.

== Constructions ==
- Given a closed, convex subset K of Hilbert space V, the outward normal cone to the set K at the point x in K is given by
  $$N_K(x) = \left\{ p \in V \colon \forall x^* \in K, \left\langle p, x^* - x \right\rangle \leq 0 \right\}.$$
- Given a closed, convex subset K of V, the tangent cone (or contingent cone) to the set K at the point x is given by
  $$T_K(x) = \overline{\bigcup_{h>0} \frac{K - x}{h}}.$$
- Given a closed, convex subset K of Hilbert space V, the tangent cone to the set K at the point x in K can be defined as polar cone to outwards normal cone $N_K(x)$:
  $$T_K(x) = N_K^o(x) \ \overset{\underset{\mathrm{def}}{}}{=}\  \{y \in V \mid \forall \xi \in N_K(x): \langle y, \xi \rangle \leqslant 0 \}$$

Both the normal and tangent cone have the property of being closed and convex.

They are important concepts in the fields of convex optimization, variational inequalities and projected dynamical systems.

== Properties ==
If C is a non-empty convex cone in X, then the linear span of C is equal to C - C and the largest vector subspace of X contained in C is equal to C ∩ (−C).

== Partial order defined by a convex cone ==
A pointed and salient convex cone C induces a partial ordering "≥" on V, defined so that $x\geq y$ if and only if $x-y\in C.$ (If the cone is flat, the same definition gives merely a preorder.) Sums and positive scalar multiples of valid inequalities with respect to this order remain valid inequalities. A vector space with such an order is called an ordered vector space. Examples include the product order on real-valued vectors, $\R^n,$ and the Loewner order on positive semidefinite matrices. Such an ordering is commonly found in semidefinite programming.

== See also ==
- Cone (disambiguation)
  - Cone (geometry)
  - Cone (topology)
- Farkas' lemma
- Bipolar theorem
- Ordered vector space
