= James Oxley =

Australian–American mathematician

James G. Oxley is an Australian–American mathematician, Boyd Professor of Mathematics at Louisiana State University. He is known for his expertise in matroid theory and graph theory.

Oxley did his undergraduate studies in Australia, and earned a doctorate from the University of Oxford in 1978, under the supervision of Dominic Welsh. He joined the Louisiana State University faculty in 1982.

Oxley is the author of the book Matroid Theory (Oxford University Press, 1992).

In 2012 he became a fellow of the American Mathematical Society.
