= Exotic affine space =

Real affine space of even dimension that is not isomorphic to a complex affine space

In algebraic geometry, an exotic affine space is a complex algebraic variety that is diffeomorphic to $\mathbb{R}^{2n}$ for some n, but is not isomorphic as an algebraic variety to $\mathbb{C}^n$. An example of an exotic $\mathbb C^3$ is the Koras–Russell cubic threefold, which is the subset of $\mathbb C^4$ defined by the polynomial equation

$$\{(z_1,z_2,z_3,z_4)\in\mathbb C^4|z_1+z_1^2z_2+z_3^3+z_4^2=0\}.$$
