= Conical combination =

Given a finite number of vectors $x_1, x_2, \dots, x_n$ in a real vector space, a conical combination, conic combination, conical sum, or weighted sum of these vectors is a vector of the form

$$\alpha_1x_1+\alpha_2x_2+\cdots+\alpha_nx_n$$

where $\alpha_i$ are non-negative real numbers.

The name derives from the fact that the set of all conical sum of vectors defines a cone (possibly in a lower-dimensional subspace).

== Conical hull ==
The set of all conical combinations for a given set $S$ is called the conical hull (or conic hull) of $S$ and denoted $\operatorname{cone}(S)$ or $\operatorname{coni}(S)$. That is,

$$\operatorname{coni} (S)=\left\{ \sum_{i=1}^k \alpha_i x_i : x_i \in S,\, \alpha_i \in \mathbb{R}_{\ge 0},\, k \in \N \right\}.$$

By taking $k = 0$, it follows the zero vector (origin) belongs to all conical hulls (since the summation becomes an empty sum).

The conical hull of a set $S$ is a convex set. In fact, it is the intersection of all convex cones containing S plus the origin. If $S$ is a compact set (in particular, when it is a finite non-empty set of points), then the condition "plus the origin" is unnecessary.

If we discard the origin, we can divide all coefficients by their sum to see that a conical combination is a convex combination scaled by a positive factor.

In the plane, the conical hull of a circle passing through the origin is the open half-plane defined by the tangent line to the circle at the origin plus the origin.

Therefore, "conical combinations" and "conical hulls" are in fact "convex conical combinations" and "convex conical hulls" respectively. Moreover, the above remark about dividing the coefficients while discarding the origin implies that the conical combinations and hulls may be considered as convex combinations and convex hulls in the projective space.

While the convex hull of a compact set is also a compact set, this is not so for the conical hull; first of all, the latter one is unbounded. Moreover, it is not even necessarily a closed set: a counterexample is a sphere passing through the origin, with the conical hull being an open half-space plus the origin. However, if $S$ is a non-empty convex compact set which does not contain the origin, then the convex conical hull of $S$ is a closed set.

== See also ==
=== Related combinations ===
- Affine combination
- Convex combination
- Linear combination
