= List of convexity topics =

This is a list of convexity topics, by Wikipedia page.

- Alpha blending - the process of combining a translucent foreground color with a background color, thereby producing a new blended color. This is a convex combination of two colors allowing for transparency effects in computer graphics.
- Barycentric coordinates - a coordinate system in which the location of a point of a simplex (a triangle, tetrahedron, etc.) is specified as the center of mass, or barycenter, of masses placed at its vertices. The coordinates are non-negative for points in the convex hull.
- Borsuk's conjecture - a conjecture about the number of pieces required to cover a body with a larger diameter. Solved by Hadwiger for the case of smooth convex bodies.
- Bond convexity - a measure of the non-linear relationship between price and yield duration of a bond to changes in interest rates, the second derivative of the price of the bond with respect to interest rates. A basic form of convexity in finance.
- Carathéodory's theorem (convex hull) - If a point x of R^{d} lies in the convex hull of a set P, there is a subset of P with d+1 or fewer points such that x lies in its convex hull.
- Choquet theory - an area of functional analysis and convex analysis concerned with measures with support on the extreme points of a convex set C. Roughly speaking, all vectors of C should appear as "averages" of extreme points.
- Complex convexity — extends the notion of convexity to complex numbers.
- Convex analysis - the branch of mathematics devoted to the study of properties of convex functions and convex sets, often with applications in convex minimization.
- Convex combination - a linear combination of points where all coefficients are non-negative and sum to 1. All convex combinations are within the convex hull of the given points.
- Convex and Concave - a print by Escher in which many of the structure's features can be seen as both convex shapes and concave impressions.
- Convex body - a compact convex set in a Euclidean space whose interior is non-empty.
- Convex conjugate - a dual of a real functional in a vector space. Can be interpreted as an encoding of the convex hull of the function's epigraph in terms of its supporting hyperplanes.
- Convex curve - a plane curve that lies entirely on one side of each of its supporting lines. The interior of a closed convex curve is a convex set.
- Convex function - a function in which the line segment between any two points on the graph of the function lies above the graph.
  - Closed convex function - a convex function all of whose sublevel sets are closed sets.
  - Proper convex function - a convex function whose effective domain is nonempty and it never attains minus infinity.
  - Concave function - the negative of a convex function.
- Convex geometry - the branch of geometry studying convex sets, mainly in Euclidean space. Contains three sub-branches: general convexity, polytopes and polyhedra, and discrete geometry.
- Convex hull (aka convex envelope) - the smallest convex set that contains a given set of points in Euclidean space.
- Convex lens - a lens in which one or two sides is curved or bowed outwards. Light passing through the lens is converged (or focused) to a spot behind the lens.
- Convex optimization - a subfield of optimization, studies the problem of minimizing convex functions over convex sets. The convexity property can make optimization in some sense "easier" than the general case - for example, any local minimum must be a global minimum.
- Convex polygon - a 2-dimensional polygon whose interior is a convex set in the Euclidean plane.
- Convex polytope - an n-dimensional polytope which is also a convex set in the Euclidean n-dimensional space.
- Convex set - a set in Euclidean space in which contains every segment between every two of its points.
- Convexity (finance) - refers to non-linearities in a financial model. When the price of an underlying variable changes, the price of an output does not change linearly, but depends on the higher-order derivatives of the modeling function. Geometrically, the model is no longer flat but curved, and the degree of curvature is called the convexity.
- Duality (optimization)
- Epigraph (mathematics) - for a function f : Rn→R, the set of points lying on or above its graph
- Extreme point - for a convex set S in a real vector space, a point in S which does not lie in any open line segment joining two points of S.
- Fenchel conjugate
- Fenchel's inequality
- Fixed-point theorems in infinite-dimensional spaces, generalise the Brouwer fixed-point theorem. They have applications, for example, to the proof of existence theorems for partial differential equations
- Four vertex theorem - every convex curve has at least 4 vertices.
- Gift wrapping algorithm - an algorithm for computing the convex hull of a given set of points
- Graham scan - a method of finding the convex hull of a finite set of points in the plane with time complexity O(n log n)
- Hadwiger conjecture (combinatorial geometry) - any convex body in n-dimensional Euclidean space can be covered by 2^{n} or fewer smaller bodies homothetic with the original body.
- Hadwiger's theorem - a theorem that characterizes the valuations on convex bodies in R^{n}.
- Helly's theorem
- Hyperplane - a subspace whose dimension is one less than that of its ambient space
- Indifference curve
- Infimal convolute
- Interval (mathematics) - a set of real numbers with the property that any number that lies between two numbers in the set is also included in the set
- Jarvis march
- Jensen's inequality - relates the value of a convex function of an integral to the integral of the convex function
- John ellipsoid - E(K) associated to a convex body K in n-dimensional Euclidean space R^{n} is the ellipsoid of maximal n-dimensional volume contained within K.
- Lagrange multiplier - a strategy for finding the local maxima and minima of a function subject to equality constraints
- Legendre transformation - an involutive transformation on the real-valued convex functions of one real variable
- Locally convex topological vector space - example of topological vector spaces (TVS) that generalize normed spaces
- Macbeath regions
- Mahler volume - a dimensionless quantity that is associated with a centrally symmetric convex body
- Minkowski's theorem - any convex set in $\mathbb{R}^n$ which is symmetric with respect to the origin and with volume greater than 2n d(L) contains a non-zero lattice point
- Mixed volume
- Mixture density
- Newton polygon - a tool for understanding the behaviour of polynomials over local fields
- Plurisubharmonic function
- Pseudoconvexity
- Radon's theorem - on convex sets, that any set of d + 2 points in R^{d} can be partitioned into two disjoint sets whose convex hulls intersect
- Separating axis theorem
- Shapley–Folkman lemma - a result in convex geometry with applications in mathematical economics that describes the Minkowski addition of sets in a vector space
- Shephard's problem - a geometrical question
- Simplex - a generalization of the notion of a triangle or tetrahedron to arbitrary dimensions
  - Simplex method - a popular algorithm for linear programming
- Subdifferential - generalization of the derivative to functions which are not differentiable
- Supporting hyperplane - a hyperplane meeting certain conditions
  - Supporting hyperplane theorem - that defines a supporting hyperplane
