= Separoid =

Relation on disjoint pairs of sets

In mathematics, a separoid is a binary relation between disjoint sets which is stable as an ideal in the canonical order induced by inclusion. Many mathematical objects which appear to be quite different, find a common generalisation in the framework of separoids; e.g., graphs, configurations of convex sets, oriented matroids, and polytopes. Any countable category is an induced subcategory of separoids when they are endowed with homomorphisms (viz., mappings that preserve the so-called minimal Radon partitions).

In this general framework, some results and invariants of different categories turn out to be special cases of the same aspect; e.g., the pseudoachromatic number from graph theory and the Tverberg theorem from combinatorial convexity are simply two faces of the same aspect, namely, complete colouring of separoids.

== The axioms ==
A separoid is a set $S$ endowed with a binary relation $\mid\ \subseteq2^S\times2^S$ on its power set, which satisfies the following simple properties for $A,B\subseteq S$:

$$A\mid B\Leftrightarrow B\mid A,$$
$$A\mid B\Rightarrow A\cap B=\varnothing,$$
$$A\mid B \hbox{ and } A'\subset A\Rightarrow A'\mid B.$$

A related pair $A\mid B$ is called a separation and we often say that A is separated from B. It is enough to know the maximal separations to reconstruct the separoid.

A mapping $\varphi\colon S\to T$ is a morphism of separoids if the preimages of separations are separations; that is, for $A,B\subseteq T$

$$A\mid B\Rightarrow\varphi^{-1}(A)\mid\varphi^{-1}(B).$$

== Examples ==
Examples of separoids can be found in almost every branch of mathematics. Here we list just a few.

1. Given a graph G=(V,E), we can define a separoid on its vertices by saying that two (disjoint) subsets of V, say A and B, are separated if there are no edges going from one to the other; i.e.,

$$A\mid B\Leftrightarrow\forall a\in A\hbox{ and }b\in B\colon ab\not\in E.$$

2. Given an oriented matroid M = (E,T), given in terms of its topes T, we can define a separoid on E by saying that two subsets are separated if they are contained in opposite signs of a tope. In other words, the topes of an oriented matroid are the maximal separations of a separoid. This example includes, of course, all directed graphs.

3. Given a family of objects in a Euclidean space, we can define a separoid in it by saying that two subsets are separated if there exists a hyperplane that separates them; i.e., leaving them in the two opposite sides of it.

4. Given a topological space, we can define a separoid saying that two subsets are separated if there exist two disjoint open sets which contains them (one for each of them).

== The basic lemma ==
Every separoid can be represented with a family of convex sets in some Euclidean space and their separations by hyperplanes.
