= Softree Technical Systems =

- Industry: Land Development, Civil Engineering and Resource Industries
- Headquarters: North Vancouver, Canada
- Area served: Global
- Key people: Craig Speirs (Co-Founder)
- Products: RoadEng, Softree Optimal, Terrain Tools 3D
- Website: www.softree.com

Softree Technologies is a North Vancouver, British Columbia, Canada based company that develops software for the forestry, civil engineering, and energy industries.

== RoadEng ==
RoadEng is the original software program developed by Softree Technologies, with early adopters including government agencies like the USDA Forest Service. Early versions of the software had three modules: road notes (where a surveyor enters their field notes), grade design, and plan view. The program is a geometric-road-design system, that allows engineers to easily determine where the best road alignment would be for rural or other wilderness-based primary resources, especially the alignment of the roads needed for the extraction of the resource and the insertion of the machinery needed to extract it. It utilizes 3D approximations of the environment and allows individuals to pre-plan their projects. It is able to accept data produced by hand by surveyors, or produce approximations based upon other variables.

== Terrain Tools ==
Terrain Tools is a 3D mapping and engineering software product. The software is used primarily for 3D site design, stockpile volume calculations, mine surveying, quantity takeoffs, pad design, pond design, geological mapping, surface contouring and visualization, and landfill site design. Includes functions for: surveying, coordinate geometry, image manipulation, digital terrain modeling, contouring, volume and earthwork calculations, design, grading, visualization and report generation.

== Softree Optimal ==
SoftreeOptimal is a mathematical technique to automatically determine the lowest cost vertical alignment for corridor based infrastructure projects such as roads, pipelines and railways. It was developed by the University of B.C. and Softree Technical Systems Inc in 2012 based on a Mixed (Integer programming) model. SoftreeOptimal accounts for excavation, grading and material movement costs while matching user criteria such as design speed, cross section configuration, and horizontal alignment. SoftreeOptimal uses a new (patent pending) mathematical optimization methodology which guarantees optimality, while accounting for detailed design conditions.
