= Krein–Milman theorem =

On when a space equals the closed convex hull of its extreme points

Given a convex shape $K$ (light blue) and its set of extreme points $B$ (red), the convex hull of $B$ is $K.$

In the mathematical theory of functional analysis, the Krein–Milman theorem is a proposition about compact convex sets in locally convex topological vector spaces (TVSs).

Krein–Milman theorem—A compact convex subset of a Hausdorff locally convex topological vector space is equal to the closed convex hull of its extreme points.

This theorem generalizes to infinite-dimensional spaces and to arbitrary compact convex sets the following basic observation: a convex (i.e. "filled") triangle, including its perimeter and the area "inside of it", is equal to the convex hull of its three vertices, where these vertices are exactly the extreme points of this shape. This observation also holds for any other convex polygon in the plane $\R^2.$

== Statement and definitions ==
=== Preliminaries and definitions ===
A convex set in light blue, and its extreme points in red.

Throughout, $X$ will be a real or complex vector space.

For any elements $x$ and $y$ in a vector space, the set $[x, y] := \{tx + (1-t)y : 0 \leq t \leq 1\}$ is called the closed line segment or closed interval between $x$ and $y.$ The open line segment or open interval between $x$ and $y$ is $(x, y) := \varnothing$ when $x = y$ while it is $(x, y) := \{tx + (1-t)y : 0 < t < 1\}$ when $x \neq y;$ it satisfies $(x, y) = [x, y] \setminus \{ x, y \}$ and $[x, y] = (x, y) \cup \{x, y\}.$ The points $x$ and $y$ are called the endpoints of these interval. An interval is said to be non-degenerate or proper if its endpoints are distinct.

The intervals $[x, x] = \{x\}$ and $[x, y]$ always contain their endpoints while $(x, x) = \varnothing$ and $(x, y)$ never contain either of their endpoints. If $x$ and $y$ are points in the real line $\R$ then the above definition of $[x, y]$ is the same as its usual definition as a closed interval.

For any $p, x, y \in X,$ the point $p$ is said to (strictly) lie between $x$ and $y$ if $p$ belongs to the open line segment $(x, y).$

If $K$ is a subset of $X$ and $p \in K,$ then $p$ is called an extreme point of $K$ if it does not lie between any two distinct points of $K.$ That is, if there does not exist $x, y \in K$ and $0 < t < 1$ such that $x \neq y$ and $p = tx + (1-t) y.$ In this article, the set of all extreme points of $K$ will be denoted by $\operatorname{extreme}(K).$

For example, the vertices of any convex polygon in the plane $\R^2$ are the extreme points of that polygon. The extreme points of the closed unit disk in $\R^2$ is the unit circle. Every open interval and degenerate closed interval in $\R$ has no extreme points while the extreme points of a non-degenerate closed interval $[x, y]$ are $x$ and $y.$

A set $S$ is called convex if for any two points $x, y \in S,$ $S$ contains the line segment $[x, y].$ The smallest convex set containing $S$ is called the convex hull of $S$ and it is denoted by $\operatorname{co} S.$ The closed convex hull of a set $S,$ denoted by $\overline{\operatorname{co}}(S),$ is the smallest closed and convex set containing $S.$ It is also equal to the intersection of all closed convex subsets that contain $S$ and to the closure of the convex hull of $S$; that is,
$$\overline{\operatorname{co}}(S) = \overline{\operatorname{co}(S)},$$
where the right hand side denotes the closure of $\operatorname{co}(S)$ while the left hand side is notation. For example, the convex hull of any set of three distinct points forms either a closed line segment (if they are collinear) or else a solid (that is, "filled") triangle, including its perimeter. And in the plane $\R^2,$ the unit circle is not convex but the closed unit disk is convex and furthermore, this disk is equal to the convex hull of the circle.

The separable Hilbert space Lp space $\ell^2(\N)$ of square-summable sequences with the usual norm $\|\cdot\|_2$ has a compact subset $S$ whose convex hull $\operatorname{co}(S)$ is not closed and thus also not compact. However, like in all complete Hausdorff locally convex spaces, the closed convex hull $\overline{\operatorname{co}} S$ of this compact subset is compact. But, if a Hausdorff locally convex space is not complete, then it is in general not guaranteed that $\overline{\operatorname{co}} S$ is compact whenever $S$ is; an example can even be found in a (non-complete) pre-Hilbert vector subspace of $\ell^2(\N).$ Every compact subset is totally bounded (also called "precompact") and the closed convex hull of a totally bounded subset of a Hausdorff locally convex space is guaranteed to be totally bounded.

=== Statement ===
Krein–Milman theorem—If $K$ is a compact subset of a Hausdorff locally convex topological vector space then the set of extreme points of $K$ has the same closed convex hull as $K.$

In the case where the compact set $K$ is also convex, the above theorem has as a corollary the first part of the next theorem, which is also often called the Krein–Milman theorem.

Krein–Milman theorem—Suppose $X$ is a Hausdorff locally convex topological vector space (for example, a normed space) and $K$ is a compact and convex subset of $X.$ Then $K$ is equal to the closed convex hull of its extreme points:
$$K ~=~ \overline{\operatorname{co}} (\operatorname{extreme}(K)).$$

Moreover, if $B \subseteq K$ then $K$ is equal to the closed convex hull of $B$ if and only if $\operatorname{extreme} K \subseteq \operatorname{cl} B,$ where $\operatorname{cl} B$ is closure of $B.$

The convex hull of the extreme points of $K$ forms a convex subset of $K$ so the main burden of the proof is to show that there are enough extreme points so that their convex hull covers all of $K.$ For this reason, the following corollary to the above theorem is also often called the Krein–Milman theorem.

(KM) Krein–Milman theorem (Existence)—Every non-empty compact convex subset of a Hausdorff locally convex topological vector space has an extreme point; that is, the set of its extreme points is not empty.

To visualized this theorem and its conclusion, consider the particular case where $K$ is a convex polygon. In this case, the corners of the polygon (which are its extreme points) are all that is needed to recover the polygon shape. The statement of the theorem is false if the polygon is not convex, as then there are many ways of drawing a polygon having given points as corners.

The requirement that the convex set $K$ be compact can be weakened to give the following strengthened generalization version of the theorem.

(SKM) Strong Krein–Milman theorem (Existence)—Suppose $X$ is a Hausdorff locally convex topological vector space and $K$ is a non-empty convex subset of $X$ with the property that whenever $\mathcal{C}$ is a cover of $K$ by convex closed subsets of $X$ such that $\{K \cap C : C \in \mathcal{C}\}$ has the finite intersection property, then $K \cap \bigcap_{C \in \mathcal{C}} C$ is not empty. Then $\operatorname{extreme}(K)$ is not empty.

The property above is sometimes called quasicompactness or convex compactness. Compactness implies convex compactness because a topological space is compact if and only if every family of closed subsets having the finite intersection property (FIP) has non-empty intersection (that is, its kernel is not empty). The definition of convex compactness is similar to this characterization of compact spaces in terms of the FIP, except that it only involves those closed subsets that are also convex (rather than all closed subsets).

== More general settings ==
The assumption of local convexity for the ambient space is necessary, because James Roberts (1977) constructed a counter-example for the non-locally convex space $L^p[0, 1]$ where $0 < p < 1.$

Linearity is also needed, because the statement fails for weakly compact convex sets in CAT(0) spaces, as proved by Nicolas Monod (2016). However, Theo Buehler (2006) proved that the Krein–Milman theorem does hold for metrically compact CAT(0) spaces.

== Related results ==
Under the previous assumptions on $K,$ if $T$ is a subset of $K$ and the closed convex hull of $T$ is all of $K,$ then every extreme point of $K$ belongs to the closure of $T.$ This result is known as Milman's (partial) converse to the Krein–Milman theorem.

The Choquet–Bishop–de Leeuw theorem states that every point in $K$ is the barycenter of a probability measure supported on the set of extreme points of $K.$

== Relation to the axiom of choice ==
Under the Zermelo–Fraenkel set theory (ZF) axiomatic framework, the axiom of choice (AC) suffices to prove all versions of the Krein–Milman theorem given above, including statement KM and its generalization SKM. The axiom of choice also implies, but is not equivalent to, the Boolean prime ideal theorem (BPI), which is equivalent to the Banach–Alaoglu theorem. Conversely, the Krein–Milman theorem KM together with the Boolean prime ideal theorem (BPI) imply the axiom of choice. In summary, AC holds if and only if both KM and BPI hold. It follows that under ZF, the axiom of choice is equivalent to the following statement:

The closed unit ball of the continuous dual space of any real normed space has an extreme point.

Furthermore, SKM together with the Hahn–Banach theorem for real vector spaces (HB) are also equivalent to the axiom of choice. It is known that BPI implies HB, but that it is not equivalent to it (said differently, BPI is strictly stronger than HB).

== History ==
The original statement proved by Mark Krein and David Milman (1940) was somewhat less general than the form stated here.

Earlier, Hermann Minkowski (1911) proved that if $X$ is 3-dimensional then $K$ equals the convex hull of the set of its extreme points. This assertion was expanded to the case of any finite dimension by Ernst Steinitz (1916). The Krein–Milman theorem generalizes this to arbitrary locally convex $X$; however, to generalize from finite to infinite dimensional spaces, it is necessary to use the closure.

== See also ==
- Banach–Alaoglu theorem – Theorem in functional analysis
- Carathéodory's theorem (convex hull) – Point in the convex hull of a set P in Rd, is the convex combination of d+1 points in P
- Choquet theory – Area of functional analysis and convex analysis
- Helly's theorem – Theorem about the intersections of d-dimensional convex sets
- Radon's theorem – Says d+2 points in d dimensions can be partitioned into two subsets whose convex hulls intersect
- Shapley–Folkman lemma – Sums of sets of vectors are nearly convex
- Topological vector space – Vector space with a notion of nearness

== Bibliography ==
- Adasch, Norbert; Ernst, Bruno; Keim, Dieter (1978). Topological Vector Spaces: The Theory Without Convexity Conditions. Lecture Notes in Mathematics. Vol. 639. Berlin New York: Springer-Verlag. ISBN 978-3-540-08662-8. OCLC 297140003.
- Aliprantis, Charalambos D.; Border, Kim C. (2006). Infinite Dimensional Analysis: A Hitchhiker's Guide (Third ed.). Berlin: Springer Science & Business Media. ISBN 978-3-540-29587-7. OCLC 262692874.
- Bourbaki, Nicolas (1987) [1981]. Topological Vector Spaces: Chapters 1–5. Éléments de mathématique. Translated by Eggleston, H.G.; Madan, S. Berlin New York: Springer-Verlag. ISBN 3-540-13627-4. OCLC 17499190.
- Black, Paul E., ed. (2004-12-17). "extreme point". Dictionary of algorithms and data structures. US National institute of standards and technology.
- Borowski, Ephraim J.; Borwein, Jonathan M. (1989). "extreme point". Dictionary of mathematics. Collins dictionary. HarperCollins. ISBN 0-00-434347-6.
- Grothendieck, Alexander (1973). Topological Vector Spaces. Translated by Chaljub, Orlando. New York: Gordon and Breach Science Publishers. ISBN 978-0-677-30020-7. OCLC 886098.
- Jarchow, Hans (1981). Locally convex spaces. Stuttgart: B.G. Teubner. ISBN 978-3-519-02224-4. OCLC 8210342.
- Kelley, John L.; Namioka, Isaac (1963). Linear Topological Spaces. Graduate Texts in Mathematics. Vol. 36. Berlin, Heidelberg: Springer-Verlag. ISBN 978-3-662-41768-3. OCLC 913438183.
- Köthe, Gottfried (1983) [1969]. Topological Vector Spaces I. Grundlehren der mathematischen Wissenschaften. Vol. 159. Translated by Garling, D.J.H. New York: Springer Science & Business Media. ISBN 978-3-642-64988-2. MR 0248498. OCLC 840293704.
- Köthe, Gottfried (1979). Topological Vector Spaces II. Grundlehren der mathematischen Wissenschaften. Vol. 237. New York: Springer Science & Business Media. ISBN 978-0-387-90400-9. OCLC 180577972.
- Pincus, David (1974). "The strength of the Hahn-Banach theorem". In Hurd, A.; Loeb, P. (eds.). Victoria Symposium on Nonstandard Analysis. Lecture Notes in Mathematics. Vol. 369. Berlin, Heidelberg: Springer. pp. 203–248. doi:10.1007/bfb0066014. ISBN 978-3-540-06656-9. ISSN 0075-8434.
- Narici, Lawrence; Beckenstein, Edward (2011). Topological Vector Spaces. Pure and applied mathematics (Second ed.). Boca Raton, FL: CRC Press. ISBN 978-1584888666. OCLC 144216834.
- N. K. Nikol'skij (Ed.). Functional Analysis I. Springer-Verlag, 1992.
- Robertson, Alex P.; Robertson, Wendy J. (1980). Topological Vector Spaces. Cambridge Tracts in Mathematics. Vol. 53. Cambridge England: Cambridge University Press. ISBN 978-0-521-29882-7. OCLC 589250.
- H. L. Royden, Real Analysis. Prentice-Hall, Englewood Cliffs, New Jersey, 1988.
- Rudin, Walter (1991). Functional Analysis. International Series in Pure and Applied Mathematics. Vol. 8 (Second ed.). New York, NY: McGraw-Hill Science/Engineering/Math. ISBN 978-0-07-054236-5. OCLC 21163277.
- Schaefer, Helmut H.; Wolff, Manfred P. (1999). Topological Vector Spaces. GTM. Vol. 8 (Second ed.). New York, NY: Springer New York Imprint Springer. ISBN 978-1-4612-7155-0. OCLC 840278135.
- Schechter, Eric (1996). Handbook of Analysis and Its Foundations. San Diego, CA: Academic Press. ISBN 978-0-12-622760-4. OCLC 175294365.
- Trèves, François (2006) [1967]. Topological Vector Spaces, Distributions and Kernels. Mineola, N.Y.: Dover Publications. ISBN 978-0-486-45352-1. OCLC 853623322.
- Wilansky, Albert (2013). Modern Methods in Topological Vector Spaces. Mineola, New York: Dover Publications, Inc. ISBN 978-0-486-49353-4. OCLC 849801114.
