= Helly's selection theorem =

On convergent subsequences of functions that are locally of bounded total variation

In mathematics, Helly's selection theorem (also called the Helly selection principle) states that a uniformly bounded sequence of monotone real functions admits a convergent subsequence. In other words, it is a sequential compactness theorem for the space of uniformly bounded monotone functions. It is named for the Austrian mathematician Eduard Helly. A more general version of the theorem asserts compactness of the space BV_{loc} of functions locally of bounded total variation that are uniformly bounded at a point.

The theorem has applications throughout mathematical analysis. In probability theory, the result implies compactness of a tight family of measures.

== Statement of the theorem ==
Let (f_{n})_{n ∈ N} be a sequence of increasing functions mapping a real interval I into the real line R, and suppose that it is uniformly bounded: there are a,b ∈ R such that a ≤ f_{n} ≤ b for every n ∈ N. Then the sequence (f_{n})_{n ∈ N} admits a pointwise convergent subsequence.

== Proof ==
The proof requires the basic facts about monotonic functions: An increasing function f on an interval I has at most countably many points of discontinuity.

=== Step 1. Inductive Construction of a subsequence converging at discontinuities and rationals (diagonal process). ===
Let $A_n = \{ x \in I; f_n(y) \not\rightarrow f_n(x) \text{ as } y \to x \}$ be the set of discontinuities of $f_n$; each of these sets are countable by the above basic fact. The set $A := \left( \textstyle\bigcup_{n\in \mathbb{N}} A_n \right) \cup (I \cap \mathbb{Q})$ is countable, and it can be denoted as $\{a_n\}_{n=1}^\infty$.

By the uniform boundedness of $\{f_n\}_{n=1}^\infty$ and the Bolzano–Weierstrass theorem, there is a subsequence $\{f^{(1)}_n\}_{n=1}^\infty$ such that $\{f^{(1)}_n(a_1)\}_{n=1}^\infty$ converges. Suppose $\{f^{(k)}_n\}_{n=1}^\infty$ has been chosen such that $\{f^{(k)}_n(a_i)\}_{n=1}^\infty$ converges for $i = 1,\dots,k$, then by uniform boundedness and Bolzano–Weierstrass, there is a subsequence $\{f^{(k+1)}_n\}_{n=1}^\infty$ of $\{f^{(k)}_n\}_{n=1}^\infty$ such that $\{f^{(k)}_n(a_{k+1})\}_{n=1}^\infty$ converges, thus $\{f^{(k+1)}_n(a_i)\}_{n=1}^\infty$ converges for $i = 1,\dots,k+1$.

Let $g_k=f^{(k)}_k$, then $\{g_k\}_{k=1}^\infty$ is a subsequence of $\{f_n\}_{n=1}^\infty$ that converges pointwise everywhere in $A$.

=== Step 2. g_{k} converges in I except possibly in an at most countable set. ===
Let $h_k(x)=\sup_{a \leq x , a \in A} g_k(a)$, then, h_{k}(a)=g_{k}(a) for a∈A, h_{k} is increasing, let $h(x)=\limsup\limits_{k\rightarrow\infty}h_k(x)$, then h is increasing, since supremes and limits of increasing functions are increasing, and $h(a)=\lim\limits_{k\rightarrow\infty}g_k(a)$ for a∈ A by Step 1. Moreover, h has at most countably many discontinuities.

We will show that g_{k} converges at all continuities of h. Let x be a continuity of h, q,r∈ A, q<x<r, then $g_k(q)-h(r)\leq g_k(x)-h(x)\leq g_k(r)-h(q)$,hence

$\limsup\limits_{k\rightarrow\infty}\bigl(g_k(x)-h(x)\bigr)\leq \limsup\limits_{k\rightarrow\infty}\bigl(g_k(r)-h(q)\bigr)=h(r)-h(q)$

$h(q)-h(r)=\liminf\limits_{k\rightarrow\infty}\bigl(g_k(q)-h(r)\bigr)\leq \liminf\limits_{k\rightarrow\infty}\bigl(g_k(x)-h(x)\bigr)$

Thus,

$h(q)-h(r)\leq\liminf\limits_{k\rightarrow\infty}\bigl(g_k(x)-h(x)\bigr)\leq \limsup\limits_{k\rightarrow\infty}\bigl(g_k(x)-h(x)\bigr)\leq h(r)-h(q)$

Since h is continuous at x, by taking the limits $q\uparrow x, r\downarrow x$, we have $h(q),h(r)\rightarrow h(x)$, thus $\lim\limits_{k\rightarrow\infty}g_k(x)=h(x)$

=== Step 3. Choosing a subsequence of g_{k} that converges pointwise in I ===
This can be done with a diagonal process similar to Step 1.

With the above steps we have constructed a subsequence of (f_{n})_{n ∈ N} that converges pointwise in I.

== Generalisation to BV_{loc} ==
Let U be an open subset of the real line and let f_{n} : U → R, n ∈ N, be a sequence of functions. Suppose that (f_{n}) has uniformly bounded total variation on any W that is compactly embedded in U. That is, for all sets W ⊆ U with compact closure W̄ ⊆ U,

$$\sup_{n \in \mathbf{N}} \left( \| f_{n} \|_{L^{1} (W)} + \| \frac{\mathrm{d} f_{n}}{\mathrm{d} t} \|_{L^{1} (W)} \right) < + \infty,$$

where the derivative is taken in the sense of tempered distributions.

Then, there exists a subsequence f_{n_{k}}, k ∈ N, of f_{n} and a function f : U → R, locally of bounded variation, such that

- f_{n_{k}} converges to f pointwise almost everywhere;
- and f_{n_{k}} converges to f locally in L^{1} (see locally integrable function), i.e., for all W compactly embedded in U,

$\lim_{k \to \infty} \int_{W} \big| f_{n_{k}} (x) - f(x) \big| \, \mathrm{d} x = 0;$

- and, for W compactly embedded in U,

$\left\| \frac{\mathrm{d} f}{\mathrm{d} t} \right\|_{L^{1} (W)} \leq \liminf_{k \to \infty} \left\| \frac{\mathrm{d} f_{n_{k}}}{\mathrm{d} t} \right\|_{L^{1} (W)}.$

== Further generalizations ==
There are many generalizations and refinements of Helly's theorem. The following theorem, for BV functions taking values in Banach spaces, is due to Barbu and Precupanu:

Let X be a reflexive, separable Hilbert space and let E be a closed, convex subset of X. Let Δ : X → [0, +∞) be positive-definite and homogeneous of degree one. Suppose that z_{n} is a uniformly bounded sequence in BV([0, T]; X) with z_{n}(t) ∈ E for all n ∈ N and t ∈ [0, T]. Then there exists a subsequence z_{n_{k}} and functions δ, z ∈ BV([0, T]; X) such that

- for all t ∈ [0, T],

$$\int_{[0, t)} \Delta (\mathrm{d} z_{n_{k}}) \to \delta(t);$$

- and, for all t ∈ [0, T],

$$z_{n_{k}} (t) \rightharpoonup z(t) \in E;$$

- and, for all 0 ≤ s < t ≤ T,

$$\int_{[s, t)} \Delta(\mathrm{d} z) \leq \delta(t) - \delta(s).$$

== See also ==
- Bounded variation
- Fraňková-Helly selection theorem
- Total variation
