= Eduard Helly =

Austrian mathematician (1884–1943)

- Born: June 1, 1884; Vienna, Austrian Empire
- Died: November 28, 1943 (aged 59); Chicago, Illinois, USA
- Education: University of Vienna; University of Göttingen
- Known for: Helly's theorem Helly's selection theorem Helly metric Helly family Helly–Bray theorem
- Scientific career
- Workplaces: Monmouth University
- Doctoral advisor: Wilhelm Wirtinger; Franz Mertens
- Other academic advisors: David Hilbert

Eduard Helly (June 1, 1884 in Vienna – 28 November 1943 in Chicago) was a mathematician after whom Helly's theorem, Helly families, Helly's selection theorem, Helly metric, and the Helly–Bray theorem were named.

== Life ==
Helly earned his doctorate from the University of Vienna in 1907, with two advisors, Wilhelm Wirtinger and Franz Mertens. He then continued his studies for another year at the University of Göttingen. Richard Courant, also studying there at the same time, tells a story of Helly disrupting one of Courant's talks, which fortunately did not prevent David Hilbert from eventually hiring Courant as an assistant. After returning to Vienna, Helly worked as a tutor, gymnasium teacher, and textbook editor until World War I, when he enlisted in the Austrian army. He was shot in 1915, and spent the rest of the war as a prisoner of the Russians. In one prison camp in Berezovka, Siberia, he organized a mathematical seminar in which Tibor Radó, then an engineer, began his interest in pure mathematics. While held in another camp at Nikolsk-Ussuriysk, also in Siberia, Helly wrote important contributions on functional analysis.

After a complicated return trip, Helly finally came back to Vienna in 1920, married his wife (mathematician Elise Bloch) in 1921, and also in 1921 earned his habilitation. Unable to obtain a paid position at the university because he was seen as too old and too Jewish, he worked at a bank until the financial collapse of 1929, and then for an insurance company. After the takeover of Austria by the Nazis in 1938, he lost that job as well, and escaped to America. With the assistance of Albert Einstein, he found teaching positions at Paterson Junior College and Monmouth Junior College in New Jersey, before moving with his wife to Chicago in 1941, to work for the U.S. Army Signal Corps. In Chicago, he suffered two heart attacks, and died from the second one.

== Contributions ==
In the same 1912 paper in which he introduced Helly's selection theorem concerning the convergence of sequences of functions, Helly published a proof of a special case of the Hahn–Banach theorem, 15 years before Hans Hahn and Stefan Banach discovered it independently. Helly's proof only covers continuous functions over closed intervals of the real numbers; the more general theorem requires the ultrafilter lemma, a weakened variant of the axiom of choice, which had not yet been invented. Along with Hahn, Banach, and Norbert Wiener, Helly has subsequently been seen as one of the founders of the theory of normed vector spaces.

His most famous result, Helly's theorem on the intersection patterns of convex sets in Euclidean spaces, was published in 1923. The theorem states that, if F is a family of d-dimensional convex sets with the property that every d + 1 sets have a nonempty intersection, then the whole family has a nonempty intersection. Helly families, named after this theorem, are a set-theoretic generalization of this intersection property: they are the families of sets in which the minimal subfamilies with empty intersection consist of a bounded number of sets.

== Selected publications ==
- Helly, E. (1912), "Über lineare Funktionaloperationen", Wien. Ber. (in German), 121: 265–297, JFM 43.0418.02.
- Helly, E. (1923), "Über Mengen konvexer Körper mit gemeinschaftlichen Punkten.", J. Deutsche Math.-Ver. (in German), 32: 175–176, JFM 49.0534.02.
