= Choquet theory =

Area of functional analysis and convex analysis

In mathematics, Choquet theory, named after Gustave Choquet, is an area of functional analysis and convex analysis concerned with measures which have support on the extreme points of a convex set C. Roughly speaking, every vector of C should appear as a weighted average of extreme points, a concept made more precise by generalizing the notion of weighted average from a convex combination to an integral taken over the set E of extreme points. Here C is a subset of a real vector space V, and the main thrust of the theory is to treat the cases where V is an infinite-dimensional (locally convex Hausdorff) topological vector space along lines similar to the finite-dimensional case. The main concerns of Gustave Choquet were in potential theory. Choquet theory has become a general paradigm, particularly for treating convex cones as determined by their extreme rays, and so for many different notions of positivity in mathematics.

The two ends of a line segment determine the points in between: in vector terms the segment from v to w consists of the λv + (1 − λ)w with 0 ≤ λ ≤ 1. The classical result of Hermann Minkowski says that in Euclidean space, a bounded, closed convex set C is the convex hull of its extreme point set E, so that any c in C is a (finite) convex combination of points e of E. Here E may be a finite or an infinite set. In vector terms, by assigning non-negative weights w(e) to the e in E, almost all 0, we can represent any c in C as
$$c = \sum_{e\in E} w(e) e\$$
with
$$\sum_{e\in E} w(e) = 1.\$$

In any case the w(e) give a probability measure supported on a finite subset of E. For any affine function f on C, its value at the point c is
$$f (c) = \int f(e) d w(e).$$

In the infinite dimensional setting, one would like to make a similar statement.

== Choquet's theorem ==
Choquet's theorem states that for a compact convex metrizable subset C of a locally convex topological vector space V, given c in C there exists a probability measure w on C supported on the set E of extreme points of C such that, for any affine function f on C,

$$f (c) = \int f(e) d w(e).$$

In practice V could be a Banach space but in many important cases V is not a Banach space and it is even possible that V itself is not metrizable, such as in the case of V having the weak-* topology. The original Krein–Milman theorem follows from Choquet's result. Another corollary is the Riesz–Markov–Kakutani representation theorem for states on the continuous functions on a metrizable compact Hausdorff space.

More generally, when C is not metrizable the Choquet–Bishop–de Leeuw theorem gives a similar representation with a probability measure that vanishes on the Baire subsets of C which contain no extreme points.

In addition to the existence of a probability measure supported on the extreme boundary that represents a given point c, one might also consider the uniqueness of such measures. It is easy to see that uniqueness does not hold even in the finite dimensional setting. One can take, for counterexamples, the convex set to be a cube or a ball in R^{3}. Uniqueness does hold, however, when the convex set is a finite dimensional simplex. A finite dimensional simplex is a special case of a Choquet simplex. Any point in a Choquet simplex is represented by a unique probability measure on the extreme points.

== See also ==
- Carathéodory's theorem – Point in the convex hull of a set P in Rd, is the convex combination of d+1 points in P
- Helly's theorem – Theorem about the intersections of d-dimensional convex sets
- Krein–Milman theorem – On when a space equals the closed convex hull of its extreme points
- List of convexity topics
- Shapley–Folkman lemma – Sums of sets of vectors are nearly convex
