= Positively separated sets =

In mathematics, two non-empty subsets A and B of a given metric space (X, d) are said to be positively separated if the infimum

$$\inf_{a \in A, b \in B} d(a, b) > 0.$$

(Some authors also specify that A and B should be disjoint sets; however, this adds nothing to the definition, since if A and B have some common point p, then d(p, p) = 0, and so the infimum above is clearly 0 in that case.)

For example, on the real line with the usual distance, the open intervals (0, 2) and (3, 4) are positively separated, while (3, 4) and (4, 5) are not. In two dimensions, the graph of y = 1/x for x > 0 and the x-axis are not positively separated.
