= Helly–Bray theorem =

Theorem in probability theory

In probability theory, the Helly–Bray theorem relates the weak convergence of cumulative distribution functions to the convergence of expectations of certain measurable functions. It is named after Eduard Helly and Hubert Evelyn Bray.

Let F and F_{1}, F_{2}, ... be cumulative distribution functions on the real line. The Helly–Bray theorem states that if F_{n} converges weakly to F, then

$$\int_\mathbb{R} g(x)\,dF_n(x) \quad\xrightarrow[n\to\infty]{}\quad \int_\mathbb{R} g(x)\,dF(x)$$

for each bounded, continuous function g: R → R, where the integrals involved are Riemann–Stieltjes integrals.

Note that if X and X_{1}, X_{2}, ... are random variables corresponding to these distribution functions, then the Helly–Bray theorem does not imply that E(X_{n}) → E(X), since g(x) = x is not a bounded function.

In fact, a stronger and more general theorem holds. Let P and P_{1}, P_{2}, ... be probability measures on some set S. Then P_{n} converges weakly to P if and only if

$$\int_S g \,dP_n \quad\xrightarrow[n\to\infty]{}\quad \int_S g \,dP,$$

for all bounded, continuous and real-valued functions on S. (The integrals in this version of the theorem are Lebesgue–Stieltjes integrals.)

The more general theorem above is sometimes taken as defining weak convergence of measures (see Billingsley, 1999, p. 3).
