= Helly metric =

Metric to measure distances between strategies in game theory

In game theory, the Helly metric is used to assess the distance between two strategies. It is named for Eduard Helly.

== Definition ==
Consider a game $\Gamma=\left\langle\mathfrak{X},\mathfrak{Y},H\right\rangle$, between player I and II. Here, $\mathfrak{X}$ and $\mathfrak{Y}$ are the sets of pure strategies for players I and II respectively. The payoff function is denoted by $H=H(\cdot,\cdot)$. In other words, if player I plays $x\in\mathfrak{X}$ and player II plays $y\in\mathfrak{Y}$, then player I pays $H(x,y)$ to player II.

The Helly metric $\rho(x_1,x_2)$ is defined as

$$\rho(x_1,x_2)=\sup_{y\in\mathfrak{Y}}\left| H(x_1,y)-H(x_2,y)\right|.$$

The metric so defined is symmetric, reflexive, and satisfies the triangle inequality.

== Properties ==
The Helly metric measures distances between strategies, not in terms of the differences between the strategies themselves, but in terms of the consequences of the strategies. Two strategies are distant if their payoffs are different. Note that $\rho(x_1,x_2)=0$ does not imply $x_1=x_2$ but it does imply that the consequences of $x_1$ and $x_2$ are identical; and indeed this induces an equivalence relation.

If one stipulates that $\rho(x_1,x_2)=0$ implies $x_1=x_2$, then the topology so induced is called the natural topology.

The metric on the space of player II's strategies is analogous:

$$\rho(y_1,y_2)=\sup_{x\in\mathfrak{X}}\left| H(x,y_1)-H(x,y_2)\right|.$$

Note that $\Gamma$ thus defines two Helly metrics: one for each player's strategy space.

== Conditional compactness ==
Recall the definition of $\epsilon$-net: A set $X_\epsilon$ is an $\epsilon$-net in the space $X$ with metric $\rho$ if for any $x\in X$ there exists $x_\epsilon\in X_\epsilon$ with $\rho(x,x_\epsilon)<\epsilon$.

A metric space $P$ is conditionally compact (or precompact), if for any $\epsilon>0$ there exists a finite $\epsilon$-net in $P$. Any game that is conditionally compact in the Helly metric has an $\epsilon$-optimal strategy for any $\epsilon>0$. Moreover, if the space of strategies for one player is conditionally compact, then the space of strategies for the other player is conditionally compact (in their Helly metric).
