= Helly's theorem =

Theorem about the intersections of d-dimensional convex sets

Helly's theorem for the Euclidean plane: if every triple of sets in a family of convex sets has a nonempty intersection, then the whole family has a nonempty intersection.

Helly's theorem is a basic result in discrete geometry on the intersection of convex sets. It was discovered by Eduard Helly in 1913, but not published by him until 1923, by which time alternative proofs by Radon (1921) and König (1922) had already appeared. Helly's theorem gave rise to the notion of a Helly family.

== Statement ==
Let X_{1}, ..., X_{n} be a finite collection of convex subsets of $\R^d$, with $n\geq d+1$. If the intersection of every $d+1$ of these sets is nonempty, then the whole collection has a nonempty intersection; that is,

$$\bigcap_{j=1}^n X_j\ne\varnothing.$$

For infinite collections one has to assume compactness:

Let $\{X_\alpha\}$ be a collection of compact convex subsets of $\R^d$, such that every subcollection of cardinality at most $d+1$ has nonempty intersection. Then the whole collection has nonempty intersection.

== Proof ==
We prove the finite version, using Radon's theorem as in the proof by Radon (1921). The infinite version then follows by the finite intersection property characterization of compactness: a collection of closed subsets of a compact space has a non-empty intersection if and only if every finite subcollection has a non-empty intersection (once you fix a single set, the intersection of all others with it are closed subsets of a fixed compact space).

The proof is by induction:

Base case: Let n = d + 2. By our assumptions, for every j = 1, ..., n there is a point x_{j} that is in the common intersection of all X_{i} with the possible exception of X_{j}. Now we apply Radon's theorem to the set A = {x_{1}, ..., x_{n}}, which furnishes us with disjoint subsets A_{1}, A_{2} of A such that the convex hull of A_{1} intersects the convex hull of A_{2}. Suppose that p is a point in the intersection of these two convex hulls. We claim that

$$p\in\bigcap_{j=1}^n X_j.$$

Indeed, consider any j ∈ {1, ..., n}. We shall prove that p ∈ X_{j}. Note that the only element of A that may not be in X_{j} is x_{j}. If x_{j} ∈ A_{1}, then x_{j} ∉ A_{2}, and therefore X_{j} ⊃ A_{2}. Since X_{j} is convex, it then also contains the convex hull of A_{2} and therefore also p ∈ X_{j}. Likewise, if x_{j} ∉ A_{1}, then X_{j} ⊃ A_{1}, and by the same reasoning p ∈ X_{j}. Since p is in every X_{j}, it must also be in the intersection.

Above, we have assumed that the points x_{1}, ..., x_{n} are all distinct. If this is not the case, say x_{i} = x_{k} for some i ≠ k, then x_{i} is in every one of the sets X_{j}, and again we conclude that the intersection is nonempty. This completes the proof in the case n = d + 2.

Inductive Step: Suppose n > d + 2 and that the statement is true for n−1. The argument above shows that any subcollection of d + 2 sets will have nonempty intersection. We may then consider the collection where we replace the two sets X_{n−1} and X_{n} with the single set X_{n−1} ∩ X_{n}. In this new collection, every subcollection of d + 1 sets will have nonempty intersection. The inductive hypothesis therefore applies, and shows that this new collection has nonempty intersection. This implies the same for the original collection, and completes the proof.

Topological proof of the base case

Let $X = X_1 \cup \cdots \cup X_{n+2}$, and consider the cover $\mathcal{U} = \{X_i\}_{i=1}^{n+2}$. Since the intersection of convex sets is convex, every non-empty finite intersection of elements of $\mathcal{U}$ is contractible. Hence $\mathcal{U}$ is a good cover.

By the basic nerve lemma, $X$ is homotopy equivalent to the geometric realization $|\mathcal{N}|$ of the nerve $\mathcal{N}$ of the cover. Assuming that

$X_1 \cap \cdots \cap X_{n+2} = \varnothing,$ the nerve $\mathcal{N}$ is the boundary complex of the simplex $\Delta^{n+1}$ consisting of all the $n$-faces. Therefore $|\mathcal{N}|$ is homeomorphic to $S^n$. It follows that $H_n(X) \cong H_n(S^n) \cong \mathbb{Z}.$ This is a contradiction, since $X$ is a non-compact $n$-dimensional manifold, and the top homology group of a non-compact manifold is zero.

== Colorful Helly theorem ==
The colorful Helly theorem is an extension of Helly's theorem in which, instead of one collection, there are d+1 collections of convex subsets of R^{d}.

If, for every choice of a transversal – one set from every collection – there is a point in common to all the chosen sets, then for at least one of the collections, there is a point in common to all sets in the collection.

Figuratively, one can consider the d+1 collections to be of d+1 different colors. Then the theorem says that, if every choice of one-set-per-color has a non-empty intersection, then there exists a color such that all sets of that color have a non-empty intersection.

== Fractional Helly theorem ==
For every a > 0 there is some b > 0 such that, if X_{1}, ..., X_{n} are n convex subsets of $\mathbb{R}^d$, and at least an a-fraction of (d+1)-tuples of the sets have a point in common, then a fraction of at least b of the sets have a point in common.

== See also ==
- Carathéodory's theorem
- Doignon's theorem
- Kirchberger's theorem
- Shapley–Folkman lemma
- Krein–Milman theorem
- Choquet theory
- Radon's theorem, and its generalization, Tverberg's theorem
- Cantor's intersection theorem - another theorem on intersection of sets
- Helly Family
