= List of theorems =

This is a list of notable theorems. Lists of theorems and similar statements include:

- List of algebras
- List of algorithms
- List of axioms
- List of conjectures
- List of data structures
- List of derivatives and integrals in alternative calculi
- List of equations
- List of fundamental theorems
- List of hypotheses
- List of inequalities
- Lists of integrals
- List of laws
- List of lemmas
- List of limits
- List of logarithmic identities
- List of mathematical functions
- List of mathematical identities
- List of mathematical proofs
- List of misnamed theorems
- List of scientific laws
- List of theories

Most of the results below come from pure mathematics, but some are from theoretical physics, economics, and other applied fields.

== Logics and foundations ==
- Ax–Grothendieck theorem (model theory)
- Barwise compactness theorem (mathematical logic)
- Borel determinacy theorem (set theory)
- Büchi-Elgot-Trakhtenbrot theorem (mathematical logic)
- Cantor–Bernstein–Schröder theorem (set theory, cardinal numbers)
- Cantor's theorem (set theory)
- Church–Rosser theorem (lambda calculus)
- Compactness theorem (mathematical logic)
- Conservativity theorem (mathematical logic)
- Craig's theorem (mathematical logic)
- Craig's interpolation theorem (mathematical logic)
- Cut-elimination theorem (proof theory)
- Deduction theorem (logic)
- Diaconescu's theorem (mathematical logic)
- Easton's theorem (set theory)
- Erdős–Dushnik–Miller theorem (set theory)
- Erdős–Rado theorem (set theory)
- Feferman–Vaught theorem (model theory)
- Friedberg–Muchnik theorem (mathematical logic)
- Fundamental theorem of equivalence relations (set theory)
- Glivenko's theorem (mathematical logic)
- Gentzen's consistency proof (proof theory)
- Gödel's completeness theorem (mathematical logic)
- Gödel's incompleteness theorem (mathematical logic)
- Goodstein's theorem (mathematical logic)
- Herbrand's theorem (logic)
- Independence of the axiom of choice (mathematical logic)
- Independence of the continuum hypothesis (mathematical logic)
- Kanamori–McAloon theorem (mathematical logic)
- Kirby–Paris theorem (proof theory)
- Kleene's recursion theorem (recursion theory)
- König's theorem (set theory, mathematical logic)
- Lindström's theorem (mathematical logic)
- Löb's theorem (mathematical logic)
- Łoś' theorem (model theory)
- Löwenheim–Skolem theorem (mathematical logic)
- Matiyasevich's theorem (mathematical logic)
- Morley's categoricity theorem (model theory)
- Paris–Harrington theorem (mathematical logic)
- Post's theorem (mathematical logic)
- Richardson's theorem (mathematical logic)
- Robinson's joint consistency theorem (mathematical logic)
- Sahlqvist correspondence theorem (modal logic)
- Soundness theorem (mathematical logic)
- Tarski's indefinability theorem (mathematical logic)
- Tennenbaum's theorem (model theory)
- Uncountability of the continuum (set theory)
- Unique homomorphic extension theorem (mathematical logic)
- Well-ordering theorem (mathematical logic)
- Wilkie's theorem (model theory)
- Zorn's lemma (set theory)

== Combinatorics ==
- 2-factor theorem (graph theory)
- Abel's binomial theorem (combinatorics)
- Alspach's theorem (graph theory)
- Aztec diamond theorem (combinatorics)
- BEST theorem (graph theory)
- Baranyai's theorem (combinatorics)
- Berge's theorem (graph theory)
- Binomial theorem (algebra, combinatorics)
- Bondy's theorem (graph theory, combinatorics)
- Bondy–Chvátal theorem (graph theory)
- Brooks's theorem (graph theory)
- Bruck–Chowla–Ryser theorem (combinatorics)
- Cameron–Erdős theorem (discrete mathematics)
- Corners theorem (arithmetic combinatorics)
- Courcelle's theorem (graph theory)
- De Bruijn–Erdős theorem (graph theory)
- Dirac's theorems (graph theory)
- Erdős–Gallai theorem (graph theory)
- Erdős–Ginzburg–Ziv theorem (number theory)
- Erdős–Ko–Rado theorem (combinatorics)
- Erdős–Pósa theorem (graph theory)
- Erdős–Stone theorem (graph theory)
- Euler's partition theorem (number theory)
- Fermat polygonal number theorem (number theory)
- Five color theorem (graph theory)
- Four color theorem (graph theory)
- Freiman's theorem (number theory)
- Friendship theorem (graph theory)
- Galvin's theorem (combinatorics)
- Gomory's theorem (combinatorics)
- Graph structure theorem (graph theory)
- Grinberg's theorem (graph theory)
- Grötzsch's theorem (graph theory)
- Hajnal–Szemerédi theorem (graph theory)
- Hales–Jewett theorem (combinatorics)
- Hall's marriage theorem (combinatorics)
- Halpern–Läuchli theorem (Ramsey theory)
- Hindman's theorem (Ramsey theory)
- Kirchhoff's theorem (graph theory)
- Kneser's theorem (combinatorics)
- Kőnig's theorem (bipartite graphs)
- Kövari–Sós–Turán theorem (graph theory)
- Kruskal–Katona theorem (combinatorics)
- Kuratowski's theorem (graph theory)
- Lambek–Moser theorem (combinatorics)
- MacMahon's master theorem (enumerative combinatorics)
- Menger's theorem (graph theory)
- Milliken–Taylor theorem (Ramsey theory)
- Milliken's tree theorem (Ramsey theory)
- Multinomial theorem (algebra, combinatorics)
- Mycielski's theorem (graph theory)
- Nicomachus's theorem (number theory)
- Ore's theorem (graph theory)
- Paley's theorem (algebra)
- Perfect graph theorem (graph theory)
- Perlis theorem (graph theory)
- Planar separator theorem (graph theory)
- Pólya enumeration theorem (combinatorics)
- Ramsey's theorem (graph theory, combinatorics)
- Ringel–Youngs theorem (graph theory)
- Robbins' theorem (graph theory)
- Robertson–Seymour theorem (graph theory)
- Schnyder's theorem (graph theory)
- Schur's theorem (Ramsey theory)
- Schwenk's theorem (graph theory)
- Sensitivity theorem (computational complexity theory)
- Sperner's theorem (combinatorics)
- Stanley's reciprocity theorem (combinatorics)
- Star of David theorem (combinatorics)
- Stirling's theorem (mathematical analysis)
- Strong perfect graph theorem (graph theory)
- Symmetric hypergraph theorem (graph theory)
- Szemerédi's theorem (combinatorics)
- Theorem on friends and strangers (Ramsey theory)
- Tutte's theorem on perfect matchings (graph theory)
- Turán's theorem (graph theory)
- Van der Waerden's theorem (combinatorics)
- Vizing's theorem (graph theory)
- Wagner's theorem (graph theory)
- Zeilberger–Bressoud theorem (combinatorics)

== Order, lattices, ordered algebraic structures ==
- Birkhoff's representation theorem (lattice theory)
- Boolean prime ideal theorem (mathematical logic)
- Bourbaki–Witt theorem (order theory)
- Cantor's isomorphism theorem (order theory)
- Dilworth's theorem (combinatorics, order theory)
- Four functions theorem (combinatorics)
- Hahn embedding theorem (ordered groups)
- Hausdorff maximality theorem (set theory)
- Kleene fixed-point theorem (order theory)
- Knaster–Tarski theorem (order theory)
- Kruskal's tree theorem (order theory)
- Shannon's expansion theorem (Boolean algebra)
- Stone's representation theorem for Boolean algebras (mathematical logic)
- Szpilrajn extension theorem (axiom of choice)

== General algebraic systems ==
- Fundamental theorem on homomorphisms (abstract algebra)
- Isomorphism theorem (abstract algebra)
- Lattice theorem (abstract algebra)

== Number theory ==
- 15 and 290 theorems (number theory)
- Albert–Brauer–Hasse–Noether theorem (algebras)
- Ankeny–Artin–Chowla theorem (number theory)
- Apéry's theorem (number theory)
- Artin–Verdier duality theorem (number theory)
- ATS theorem (number theory)
- Auxiliary polynomial theorem (Diophantine approximation)
- Ax–Kochen theorem (number theory)
- Baker's theorem (number theory)
- Barban–Davenport–Halberstam theorem (analytic number theory)
- Basel problem (mathematical analysis)
- Beatty's theorem (Diophantine approximation)
- Behrend's theorem (number theory)
- Bertrand's postulate (number theory)
- Birch's theorem (algebraic number theory)
- Bombieri's theorem (number theory)
- Bombieri–Friedlander–Iwaniec theorem (number theory)
- Brauer–Siegel theorem (number theory)
- Brun's theorem (number theory)
- Brun–Titchmarsh theorem (number theory)
- Carmichael's theorem (Fibonacci numbers)
- Chebotarev's density theorem (number theory)
- Chen's theorem (number theory)
- Chowla–Mordell theorem (number theory)
- Cohn's irreducibility criterion (polynomials)
- Critical line theorem (number theory)
- Davenport–Schmidt theorem (number theory, Diophantine approximations)
- Dirichlet's approximation theorem (Diophantine approximations)
- Dirichlet's theorem on arithmetic progressions (number theory)
- Dirichlet's unit theorem (algebraic number theory)
- Equidistribution theorem (ergodic theory)
- Erdős–Kac theorem (number theory)
- Euclid's theorem (number theory)
- Euclid–Euler theorem (number theory)
- Euler's theorem (number theory)
- Fermat's Last Theorem (number theory)
- Fermat's little theorem (number theory)
- Fermat's theorem on sums of two squares (number theory)
- Ferrero–Washington theorem (algebraic number theory)
- Ford's theorem (number theory)
- Franel–Landau theorem (number theory)
- Gelfond–Schneider theorem (transcendental number theory)
- Glaisher's theorem (number theory)
- Green–Tao theorem (number theory)
- Gross–Zagier theorem (number theory)
- Grunwald–Wang theorem (algebraic number theory)
- Hardy–Ramanujan theorem (number theory)
- Hasse norm theorem (number theory)
- Hasse–Minkowski theorem (number theory)
- Herbrand–Ribet theorem (cyclotomic fields)
- Hilbert–Speiser theorem (cyclotomic fields)
- Hilbert–Waring theorem (number theory)
- Hilbert's irreducibility theorem (number theory)
- Hurwitz's theorem (number theory)
- Jacobi's four-square theorem (number theory)
- Jurkat–Richert theorem (analytic number theory)
- Kaplansky's theorem on quadratic forms (number theory)
- Khinchin's theorem (probability)
- Kronecker's theorem (Diophantine approximation)
- Kronecker–Weber theorem (number theory)
- Kummer's theorem (number theory)
- Lafforgue's theorem (algebraic number theory)
- Lagrange's four-square theorem (number theory)
- Landau prime ideal theorem (number theory)
- Lindemann–Weierstrass theorem (transcendental number theory)
- Linnik's theorem (number theory)
- Lochs's theorem (number theory)
- Lucas's theorem (number theory)
- Mahler's compactness theorem (geometry of numbers)
- Mahler's theorem (p-adic analysis)
- Maier's theorem (analytic number theory)
- Mann's theorem (number theory)
- Mazur's control theorem (number theory)
- Mertens's theorems (number theory)
- Midy's theorem (number theory)
- Mihăilescu's theorem (number theory)
- Mirsky–Newman theorem (group theory)
- Modularity theorem (number theory)
- Mordell–Weil theorem (number theory)
- Multiplicity-one theorem (group representations)
- Nagell–Lutz theorem (elliptic curves)
- Niven's theorem (number theory)
- Ostrowski's theorem (number theory)
- Pentagonal number theorem (number theory)
- Prime number theorem (number theory)
- Principal ideal theorem (algebraic number theory)
- Proth's theorem (number theory)
- Quadratic reciprocity theorem
- Ramanujan–Skolem's theorem (Diophantine equations)
- Reflection theorem (algebraic number theory)
- Ribet's theorem (elliptic curves)
- Robin's theorem (number theory)
- Rosser's theorem (number theory)
- Siegel–Walfisz theorem (analytic number theory)
- Six exponentials theorem (transcendental number theory)
- Skolem–Mahler–Lech theorem (number theory)
- Solutions to Pell's equation (number theory)
- Sophie Germain's theorem (number theory)
- Sphere packing theorems in dimensions 8 and 24 (geometry, modular forms)
- Stark–Heegner theorem (number theory)
- Subspace theorem (Diophantine approximation)
- Sylvester's theorem (number theory)
- Takagi existence theorem (number theory)
- Thabit ibn Qurra's theorem (amicable numbers)
- Thue's theorem (Diophantine equation)
- Thue–Siegel–Roth theorem (Diophantine approximation)
- Tijdeman's theorem (Diophantine equations)
- Tunnell's theorem (number theory)
- Turán–Kubilius theorem (number theory)
- Vantieghems theorem (number theory)
- Vinogradov's theorem (number theory)
- Von Staudt–Clausen theorem (number theory)
- Wilson's theorem (number theory)
- Wolstenholme's theorem (number theory)
- Zeckendorf's theorem (number theory)
- Zsigmondy's theorem (number theory)

== Field theory and polynomials ==
- Abel–Ruffini theorem (theory of equations, Galois theory)
- Artin–Schreier theorem (real closed fields)
- Chevalley–Warning theorem (field theory)
- Diller–Dress theorem (field theory)
- Fundamental theorem of Galois theory (Galois theory)
- Hasse–Arf theorem (local class field theory)
- Hilbert's theorem 90 (number theory)
- Isomorphism extension theorem (abstract algebra)
- Joubert's theorem (algebra)
- Lagrange's theorem (number theory)
- Mason–Stothers theorem (polynomials)
- Polynomial remainder theorem (polynomials)
- Primitive element theorem (field theory)
- Rational root theorem (algebra, polynomials)
- Solutions of a general cubic equation (algebra)
- Solutions of a general quartic equation (algebra)
- Strassmann's theorem (field theory)
- Sturm's theorem (theory of equations)
- Vieta's formulas (quadratics)

== Commutative algebra ==
- Artin approximation theorem (commutative algebra)
- Bézout's identity (number theory)
- Chinese remainder theorem (number theory)
- Cohen structure theorem (commutative algebra)
- Factor theorem (polynomials)
- Fundamental theorem of arithmetic (number theory)
- Going-up and going-down theorems (commutative algebra)
- Hilbert's basis theorem (commutative algebra,invariant theory)
- Hilbert's syzygy theorem (commutative algebra)
- Integral root theorem (algebra, polynomials)
- Krull's principal ideal theorem (commutative algebra)
- Lasker–Noether theorem (commutative algebra)
- Linear congruence theorem (number theory, modular arithmetic)
- Quillen–Suslin theorem (abstract algebra)
- Rédei's theorem (group theory)
- Schwartz–Zippel theorem (polynomials)
- Structure theorem for finitely generated modules over a principal ideal domain (abstract algebra)
- Unmixedness theorem (algebraic geometry)

== Algebraic geometry ==
- AF+BG theorem (algebraic geometry)
- Abel–Jacobi theorem (algebraic geometry)
- Abhyankar–Moh theorem (algebraic geometry)
- Addition theorem (algebraic geometry)
- Andreotti–Frankel theorem (algebraic geometry)
- Arithmetic Riemann–Roch theorem (algebraic geometry)
- BBD decomposition theorem (algebraic geometry)
- Base change theorems (algebraic geometry)
- Beauville–Laszlo theorem (vector bundles)
- Belyi's theorem (algebraic geometry)
- Bertini's theorem (algebraic geometry)
- Bézout's theorem (algebraic geometry)
- Borel fixed-point theorem (algebraic geometry)
- Castelnuovo theorem (algebraic geometry)
- Cayley–Salmon theorem (algebraic surfaces)
- Chasles' theorem (algebraic geometry)
- Chevalley's structure theorem (algebraic geometry)
- Faltings' theorem (Diophantine geometry)
- Fulton–Hansen connectedness theorem (algebraic geometry)
- Grauert–Riemenschneider vanishing theorem (algebraic geometry)
- Grothendieck–Hirzebruch–Riemann–Roch theorem (algebraic geometry)
- Grothendieck's connectedness theorem (algebraic geometry)
- Haboush's theorem (algebraic groups, representation theory, invariant theory)
- Harnack's curve theorem (real algebraic geometry)
- Hasse's theorem on elliptic curves (number theory)
- Hilbert's Nullstellensatz (theorem of zeroes) (commutative algebra, algebraic geometry)
- Hironaka theorem (algebraic geometry)
- Hodge index theorem (algebraic surfaces)
- Katz–Lang finiteness theorem (number theory)
- Lefschetz hyperplane theorem (algebraic topology)
- Leray's theorem (algebraic geometry)
- Manin–Drinfeld theorem (number theory)
- Max Noether's theorem (algebraic geometry)
- Mazur's torsion theorem (algebraic geometry)
- Mumford vanishing theorem (algebraic geometry)
- Nagata's compactification theorem (algebraic geometry)
- Noether's theorem on rationality for surfaces (algebraic surfaces)
- Proper base change theorem (algebraic geometry)
- Puiseux's theorem (algebraic geometry)
- Ramanujam vanishing theorem (algebraic geometry)
- Reider's theorem (algebraic surfaces)
- Riemann–Roch theorem for surfaces (algebraic surfaces)
- Sylvester pentahedral theorem (invariant theory)
- Theorem of the cube (algebraic varieties)
- Torelli theorem (algebraic geometry)
- Tsen's theorem (algebraic geometry)
- Weber's theorem (algebraic curves)
- Zariski's connectedness theorem (algebraic geometry)
- Zariski's main theorem (algebraic geometry)

== Linear and multilinear algebra; matrix theory ==
- Amitsur–Levitzki theorem (linear algebra)
- Binomial inverse theorem (linear algebra)
- Birkhoff–Von Neumann theorem (linear algebra)
- Bregman–Minc inequality (discrete mathematics)
- Cauchy-Binet formula (linear algebra)
- Cayley–Hamilton theorem (Linear algebra)
- Dimension theorem for vector spaces (vector spaces, linear algebra)
- Euler's rotation theorem (geometry)
- Exchange theorem (linear algebra)
- Gamas's Theorem (multilinear algebra)
- Gershgorin circle theorem (matrix theory)
- Inverse eigenvalues theorem (linear algebra)
- Perron–Frobenius theorem (matrix theory)
- Principal axis theorem (linear algebra)
- Rank–nullity theorem (linear algebra)
- Rouché–Capelli theorem (Linear algebra)
- Sinkhorn's theorem (matrix theory)
- Specht's theorem (matrix theory)
- Spectral theorem (linear algebra, functional analysis)
- Sylvester's determinant theorem (determinants)
- Sylvester's law of inertia (quadratic forms)
- Witt's theorem (quadratic forms)

== Associative rings and algebras ==
- Artin–Wedderburn theorem (abstract algebra)
- Artin–Zorn theorem (algebra)
- Brauer–Cartan–Hua theorem (ring theory)
- Frobenius theorem (abstract algebras)
- Goldie's theorem (ring theory)
- Jacobson density theorem (ring theory)
- Jacobson–Bourbaki theorem (algebra)
- Levitzky's theorem (ring theory)
- Regev's theorem (ring theory)
- Skolem–Noether theorem (simple algebras)
- Wedderburn's little theorem (ring theory)
- Wedderburn's theorem (abstract algebra)

== Nonassociative rings and algebras ==
- Ado's theorem (Lie algebra)
- Goddard–Thorn theorem (vertex algebras)
- Hurwitz's theorem (normed division algebras)
- Jacobson–Morozov theorem (Lie algebra)
- Levi's theorem (Lie groups)
- Lie's theorem (Lie algebra)
- Poincaré–Birkhoff–Witt theorem (universal enveloping algebras)
- Shirshov–Cohn theorem (Jordan algebras)
- Shirshov–Witt theorem (Lie algebras)

== Category theory and homological algebra ==
- Beck's monadicity theorem (category theory)
- Bruguières modularity theorem (category theory)
- Freyd's adjoint functor theorem (category theory)
- Golod–Shafarevich theorem (group theory)
- Lawvere's fixed-point theorem (mathematical logic)
- Mitchell's embedding theorem (category theory)
- The duality theorem (topology)
- Yoneda lemma (category theory)

== K-theory ==
- Atiyah–Segal completion theorem (homotopy theory)
- Snaith's theorem (algebraic topology)

== Group theory and generalizations ==
- Alperin–Brauer–Gorenstein theorem (finite groups)
- Bass-Guirvarc'h formula (group theory)
- Bass-Serre theorem (group theory)
- Borel–Bott–Weil theorem (representation theory)
- Borel–Weil theorem (representation theory)
- Brauer–Nesbitt theorem (representation theory of finite groups)
- Brauer–Suzuki theorem (finite groups)
- Brauer–Suzuki–Wall theorem (group theory)
- Brauer's theorem (number theory)
- Brauer's theorem on induced characters (representation theory of finite groups)
- Burnside's theorem (group theory)
- Cartan–Dieudonné theorem (group theory)
- Cauchy's theorem (finite groups)
- Cayley's theorem (group theory)
- Chevalley–Shephard–Todd theorem (finite group)
- Classification of finite simple groups (group theory)
- Feit–Thompson theorem (finite groups)
- Fitting's theorem (group theory)
- Flat torus theorem (geometric group theory)
- Focal subgroup theorem (abstract algebra)
- Frobenius determinant theorem (group theory)
- Frobenius reciprocity theorem (group representations)
- Frucht's theorem (graph theory)
- Great orthogonality theorem (group theory)
- Gromov's theorem on groups of polynomial growth (geometric group theory)
- Grushko theorem (group theory)
- Higman's embedding theorem (group theory)
- Isoperimetric gap (geometric group theory, metric geometry)
- Jordan–Hölder theorem (group theory)
- Jordan–Schur theorem (group theory)
- Jordan's theorem (multiply transitive groups) (group theory)
- Krull–Schmidt theorem (group theory)
- Kurosh subgroup theorem (group theory)
- L-balance theorem (finite groups)
- Lagrange's theorem (group theory)
- Lie–Kolchin theorem (algebraic groups, representation theory)
- Maschke's theorem (group representations)
- Moufang's theorem (loop theory)
- Nagao's theorem (group theory)
- Nielsen–Schreier theorem (free groups)
- Orbit-stabilizer theorem (group theory)
- Schreier refinement theorem (group theory)
- Schur's lemma (representation theory)
- Schur–Zassenhaus theorem (group theory)
- Sela's theorem (hyperbolic groups)
- Stallings theorem about ends of groups (group theory)
- Superrigidity theorem (algebraic groups)
- Švarc-Milnor lemma (geometric group theory)
- Sylow theorems (group theory)
- Thompson transitivity theorem (finite groups)
- Thompson uniqueness theorem (finite groups)
- Tits alternative (geometric group theory)
- Trichotomy theorem (finite groups)
- Walter theorem (finite groups)
- Z* theorem (finite groups)
- ZJ theorem (finite groups)

== Topological groups, Lie groups ==
- Cartan's theorem (Lie group)
- Harish–Chandra theorem (representation theory)
- Harish–Chandra's regularity theorem (representation theory)
- Iwasawa decomposition (Lie theory)
- Kempf–Ness theorem (algebraic geometry)
- Lie's third theorem (Lie group)
- Montgomery-Zippin-Gleason theorem (Transformation groups)
- Plancherel theorem for spherical functions (representation theory)
- Trombi–Varadarajan theorem (Lie group)

== Real functions ==
- Anderson's theorem (real analysis)
- Bernstein's theorem (functional analysis)
- Bohr–Mollerup theorem (gamma function)
- Bolzano's theorem (real analysis, calculus)
- Constant rank theorem (multivariate calculus)
- Cousin's lemma (real analysis)
- Danskin's theorem (convex analysis)
- Darboux's theorem (real analysis)
- Denjoy–Carleman theorem (functional analysis)
- Denjoy–Young–Saks theorem (real analysis)
- Dini's theorem (analysis)
- Divergence theorem (vector calculus)
- Fermat's theorem (stationary points) (real analysis)
- Fraňková–Helly selection theorem (mathematical analysis)
- Froda's theorem (mathematical analysis)
- Fubini's theorem on differentiation (real analysis)
- Fundamental theorem of calculus (calculus)
- Gauss theorem (vector calculus)
- Gradient theorem (vector calculus)
- Green's theorem (vector calculus)
- Helly's selection theorem (mathematical analysis)
- Implicit function theorem (vector calculus)
- Increment theorem (mathematical analysis)
- Intermediate value theorem (calculus)
- Inverse function theorem (vector calculus)
- Kolmogorov–Arnold representation theorem (real analysis, approximation theory)
- Lebesgue differentiation theorem (real analysis)
- Luzin's theorem (real analysis)
- Malgrange preparation theorem (singularity theory)
- Mean value theorem (calculus)
- Monotone convergence theorem (mathematical analysis)
- Müntz–Szász theorem (functional analysis)
- Rademacher's theorem (mathematical analysis)
- Rising sun lemma (real analysis)
- Rolle's theorem (calculus)
- Squeeze theorem (mathematical analysis)
- Stokes's theorem (vector calculus, differential topology)
- Titchmarsh convolution theorem (complex analysis)
- Whitney extension theorem (mathematical analysis)
- Zahorski theorem (real analysis)

== Measure and integration ==
- Banach–Tarski theorem (measure theory)
- Brunn–Minkowski theorem (Riemannian geometry)
- Cameron–Martin theorem (measure theory)
- Carathéodory's extension theorem (measure theory)
- Cramér–Wold theorem (measure theory)
- Disintegration theorem (measure theory)
- Dominated convergence theorem (Lebesgue integration)
- Egorov's theorem (measure theory)
- Fatou–Lebesgue theorem (real analysis)
- Fubini's theorem (integration)
- Hahn decomposition theorem (measure theory)
- Hahn–Kolmogorov theorem (measure theory)
- Ham sandwich theorem (topology)
- Hobby–Rice theorem (mathematical analysis)
- Kōmura's theorem (measure theory)
- Lebesgue's decomposition theorem (measure theory)
- Lebesgue's density theorem (measure theory)
- Maharam's theorem (measure theory)
- Minlos's theorem (functional analysis)
- Monotone class theorem (measure theory)
- Prokhorov's theorem (measure theory)
- Radon–Nikodym theorem (measure theory)
- Schilder's theorem (stochastic processes)
- Schröder–Bernstein theorem for measurable spaces (measure theory)
- Stein–Strömberg theorem (measure theory)
- Steinhaus theorem (measure theory)
- Stone–Tukey theorem (topology)
- Structure theorem for Gaussian measures (measure theory)
- Vitali convergence theorem (measure theory)
- Vitali theorem (measure theory)
- Vitali–Hahn–Saks theorem (measure theory)

== Functions of a complex variable ==
- Akhiezer's theorem (complex analysis)
- Arakelyan's theorem (complex analysis)
- Area theorem (conformal mapping) (complex analysis)
- Beurling–Lax theorem (Hardy spaces)
- Bloch's theorem (complex analysis)
- Bôcher's theorem (complex analysis)
- Borel–Carathéodory theorem (complex analysis)
- Branching theorem (complex manifold)
- Carathéodory's theorem (complex analysis)
- Carleson–Jacobs theorem (complex analysis)
- Carlson's theorem (complex analysis)
- Cauchy integral theorem (complex analysis)
- Cauchy–Hadamard theorem (complex analysis)
- Clifford's theorem on special divisors (algebraic curves)
- Corona theorem (complex analysis)
- de Branges's theorem (complex analysis)
- De Franchis theorem (Riemann surfaces)
- Edge-of-the-wedge theorem (complex analysis)
- Farrell–Markushevich theorem (complex analysis)
- Fatou's theorem (complex analysis)
- Fundamental theorem of algebra (complex analysis)
- Gauss–Lucas theorem (complex analysis)
- Grunsky's theorem (complex analysis)
- Hadamard gap theorem (complex analysis)
- Hadamard three-circle theorem (complex analysis)
- Hadamard three-lines theorem (complex analysis)
- Hardy's theorem (complex analysis)
- Hartogs–Rosenthal theorem (complex analysis)
- Harnack's theorem (complex analysis)
- Hurwitz's automorphisms theorem (algebraic curves)
- Hurwitz's theorem (complex analysis)
- Identity theorem (complex analysis)
- Identity theorem for Riemann surfaces (Riemann surfaces)
- Koebe 1/4 theorem (complex analysis)
- Lagrange inversion theorem (mathematical analysis, combinatorics)
- Lagrange reversion theorem (mathematical analysis, combinatorics)
- Laurent expansion theorem (complex analysis)
- Lindelöf's theorem (complex analysis)
- Liouville's theorem (complex analysis, entire functions)
- Liouville's theorem (conformal mappings)
- Looman–Menchoff theorem (complex analysis)
- Marden's theorem (polynomials)
- Mergelyan's theorem (complex analysis)
- Measurable Riemann mapping theorem (conformal mapping)
- Mittag-Leffler's theorem (complex analysis)
- Monodromy theorem (complex analysis)
- Montel's theorem (complex analysis)
- Morera's theorem (complex analysis)
- Nachbin's theorem(complex analysis)
- Open mapping theorem (complex analysis)
- Phragmén–Lindelöf theorem (complex analysis)
- Picard theorem (complex analysis)
- Residue theorem (complex analysis)
- Riemann mapping theorem (complex analysis)
- Riemann's existence theorem (algebraic geometry)
- Riemann's theorem on removable singularities (complex analysis)
- Riemann–Roch theorem (Riemann surfaces, algebraic curves)
- Rouché's theorem (complex analysis)
- Routh–Hurwitz theorem (polynomials)
- Runge's theorem (complex analysis)
- Siu's semicontinuity theorem (complex analysis)
- Sokhotski–Plemelj theorem (complex analysis)
- Uniformization theorem (complex analysis, differential geometry)
- Van Vleck's theorem (mathematical analysis)
- Weierstrass–Casorati theorem (complex analysis)
- Weierstrass factorization theorem (complex analysis)

== Several complex variables and analytic spaces ==
- Appell–Humbert theorem (complex manifold)
- Baily–Borel theorem (algebraic geometry)
- Behnke–Stein theorem (several complex variables)
- Birkhoff–Grothendieck theorem (complex geometry)
- Bochner's tube theorem (complex analysis)
- Cartan's theorems A and B (several complex variables)
- Castelnuovo–de Franchis theorem (algebraic geometry)
- Chow's theorem (algebraic geometry)
- Cramer's theorem (algebraic curves) (analytic geometry)
- Hartogs's theorem (complex analysis)
- Hartogs's extension theorem (several complex variables)
- Hirzebruch–Riemann–Roch theorem (complex manifolds)
- Kawamata–Viehweg vanishing theorem (algebraic geometry)
- Kodaira embedding theorem (algebraic geometry)
- Kodaira vanishing theorem (complex manifold)
- Lefschetz theorem on (1,1)-classes (algebraic geometry)
- Local invariant cycle theorem (algebraic geometry)
- Malgrange–Zerner theorem (complex analysis)
- Newlander–Niremberg theorem (differential geometry)
- Remmert–Stein theorem (complex analysis)
- Riemann singularity theorem (algebraic geometry)
- Skoda–El Mir theorem (complex geometry)
- Weierstrass preparation theorem (several complex variables, commutative algebra)

== Special functions ==
- De Moivre's theorem (complex analysis)
- Hölder's theorem (mathematical analysis)
- Multiplication theorem (special functions)

== Ordinary differential equations ==
- Carathéodory's existence theorem (ordinary differential equations)
- Floquet's theorem (differential equations)
- Fuchs's theorem (differential equations)
- Kharitonov's theorem (control theory)
- Kneser's theorem (differential equations)
- Liénard's theorem (dynamical systems)
- Markus−Yamabe theorem (dynamical systems)
- Peano existence theorem (ordinary differential equations)
- Picard–Lindelöf theorem (ordinary differential equations)
- Shift theorem (differential operators)
- Sturm–Picone comparison theorem (differential equations)

== Partial differential equations ==
- Cartan–Kähler theorem (partial differential equations)
- Cartan–Kuranishi prolongation theorem (partial differential equations)
- Cauchy–Kowalevski theorem (partial differential equations)
- Malgrange–Ehrenpreis theorem (differential equations)

== Dynamical systems and ergodic theory ==
- Autonomous convergence theorem (dynamical systems)
- Banach fixed-point theorem (metric spaces, differential equations)
- Bendixson–Dulac theorem (dynamical systems)
- Birkhoff's theorem (ergodic theory)
- Conley–Zehnder theorem (dynamical systems)
- Curtis–Hedlund–Lyndon theorem (cellular automata)
- Hartman–Grobman theorem (dynamical systems)
- Kolmogorov–Arnold–Moser theorem (dynamical systems)
- Krylov–Bogolyubov theorem (dynamical systems)
- Maximal ergodic theorem (ergodic theory)
- No wandering domain theorem (ergodic theory)
- Noether's theorem (Lie groups, calculus of variations, differential invariants, physics)
- Ornstein theorem (ergodic theory)
- Oseledec theorem (ergodic theory)
- Peixoto's theorem (dynamical systems)
- Poincaré–Bendixson theorem (dynamical systems)
- Poincaré recurrence theorem (dynamical systems)
- Ratner's theorems (ergodic theory)
- Sarkovskii's theorem (dynamical systems)
- Takens's theorem (dynamical systems)

== Difference and functional equations ==
- Euler's theorem on homogeneous functions (multivariate calculus)

== Sequence, series, summability ==
- Abel's theorem (mathematical analysis)
- Abelian and Tauberian theorems (mathematical analysis)
- Absolute convergence theorem (mathematical series)
- Cesàro's theorem (real analysis)
- Hardy–Littlewood tauberian theorem (mathematical analysis)
- Riemann series theorem (mathematical series)
- Silverman–Toeplitz theorem (mathematical analysis)
- Śleszyński–Pringsheim theorem (continued fraction)
- Stolz–Cesàro theorem (calculus)

== Approximations and expansions ==
- Stone–Weierstrass theorem (functional analysis)
- Taylor's theorem (calculus)

== Harmonic analysis on Euclidean spaces ==
- Balian–Low theorem (Fourier analysis)
- Bernstein's theorem (approximation theory)
- Carleson's theorem (harmonic analysis)
- Convolution theorem (Fourier transforms)
- Denjoy theorem (dynamical systems)
- Fourier inversion theorem (harmonic analysis)
- Fourier theorem (harmonic analysis)
- Hausdorff-Young inequality (Fourier analysis)
- Lauricella's theorem (functional analysis)
- Paley–Wiener theorem (Fourier transforms)
- Parseval's theorem (Fourier analysis)
- Plancherel theorem (Fourier analysis)
- Riesz–Fischer theorem (real analysis)
- Szegő limit theorems (mathematical analysis)
- van der Corput's lemma (harmonic analysis)
- Wiener's tauberian theorem (real analysis)
- Wiener–Ikehara theorem (number theory)

== Abstract harmonic analysis ==
- F. and M. Riesz theorem (measure theory)
- Peter–Weyl theorem (representation theory)
- Pontryagin duality theorem (representation theory)

== Integral transforms, operational calculus ==
- Final value theorem (mathematical analysis)
- Initial value theorem (integral transform)
- Mellin inversion theorem (complex analysis)
- Stahl's theorem (matrix analysis)
- Titchmarsh theorem (integral transform)

== Integral equations ==
- Fredholm's theorem (linear algebra)

== Functional analysis ==
- Analytic Fredholm theorem (functional analysis)
- Banach–Alaoglu theorem (functional analysis)
- Banach–Mazur theorem (functional analysis)
- Banach–Steinhaus theorem (functional analysis)
- Choquet–Bishop–de Leeuw theorem (functional analysis)
- Closed range theorem (functional analysis)
- Dunford–Schwartz theorem (functional analysis)
- Eberlein–Šmulian theorem (functional analysis)
- Goldstine theorem (functional analysis)
- Hahn–Banach theorem (functional analysis)
- Hilbert projection theorem (convex analysis)
- Kachurovskii's theorem (convex analysis)
- Kirszbraun theorem (Lipschitz continuity)
- M. Riesz extension theorem (functional analysis)
- Milman–Pettis theorem (Banach space)
- Moore–Aronszajn theorem (Hilbert space)
- Orlicz–Pettis theorem (functional analysis)
- Quotient of subspace theorem (functional analysis)
- Riesz representation theorem (functional analysis, Hilbert space)
- Schauder fixed-point theorem (functional analysis)
- Schwartz kernel theorem (generalized functions)
- Sobczyk's theorem (functional analysis)
- Sobolev embedding theorem (mathematical analysis)
- Solèr's theorem (mathematical logic)
- Tikhonov fixed-point theorem (functional analysis)
- Trudinger's theorem (functional analysis)

== Operator theory ==
- Aronszajn–Smith theorem (functional analysis)
- Atiyah–Singer index theorem (elliptic differential operators, harmonic analysis)
- Atkinson's theorem (operator theory)
- Babuška–Lax–Milgram theorem (partial differential equations)
- Banach–Stone theorem (operator theory)
- Bauer–Fike theorem (spectral theory)
- Bounded inverse theorem (operator theory)
- Browder–Minty theorem (operator theory)
- Choi's theorem on completely positive maps (operator theory)
- Commutation theorem (von Neumann algebra)
- Fuglede's theorem (functional analysis)
- Gelfand–Mazur theorem (Banach algebra)
- Gelfand–Naimark theorem (functional analysis)
- Hardy–Littlewood maximal theorem (real analysis)
- Hellinger–Toeplitz theorem (functional analysis)
- Hilbert–Schmidt theorem (functional analysis)
- Hille–Yosida theorem (functional analysis)
- Kaplansky density theorem (von Neumann algebra)
- Kuiper's theorem (operator theory, topology)
- Lax–Milgram theorem (partial differential equations)
- Lions–Lax–Milgram theorem (partial differential equations)
- Lumer–Phillips theorem (semigroup theory)
- Marcinkiewicz theorem (functional analysis)
- Mazur–Ulam theorem (normed spaces)
- Mercer's theorem (functional analysis)
- Min-max theorem (functional analysis)
- Moreau's theorem (convex analysis)
- Nash–Moser theorem (mathematical analysis)
- Open mapping theorem (functional analysis)
- Peetre theorem (functional analysis)
- Riesz–Thorin theorem (functional analysis)
- Ryll-Nardzewski fixed-point theorem (functional analysis)
- Sazonov's theorem (functional analysis)
- Schröder–Bernstein theorems for operator algebras (operator algebras)
- Stinespring factorization theorem (operator theory)
- Stone's theorem on one-parameter unitary groups (functional analysis)
- Sz.-Nagy's dilation theorem (operator theory)
- Tomita's theorem (operator algebras)
- Von Neumann bicommutant theorem (functional analysis)
- Von Neumann's theorem (operator theory)

== Calculus of variations and optimal control; optimization ==
- Caristi fixed-point theorem (fixed points)
- Envelope theorem (calculus of variations)
- Isoperimetric theorem (curves, calculus of variations)
- Minimax theorem (game theory)
- Mountain pass theorem (calculus of variations)
- Noether's second theorem (calculus of variations, physics)
- Parthasarathy's theorem (game theory)
- Sion's minimax theorem (game theory)
- Tonelli's theorem (functional analysis)

== Geometry ==
- Alternate Interior Angles Theorem (geometry)
- Alternate segment theorem (geometry)
- Angle bisector theorem (Euclidean geometry)
- Anne's theorem (geometry)
- Apollonius's theorem (plane geometry)
- Barbier's theorem (geometry)
- Beck's theorem (incidence geometry)
- Beckman–Quarles theorem (Euclidean geometry)
- Beer's theorem (metric geometry)
- Brahmagupta theorem (Euclidean geometry)
- Brianchon's theorem (conics)
- British flag theorem (Euclidean geometry)
- Butterfly theorem (Euclidean geometry)
- CPCTC (triangle geometry)
- Carnot's theorem (geometry)
- Casey's theorem (Euclidean geometry)
- Cayley–Bacharach theorem (projective geometry)
- Ceva's theorem (geometry)
- Clifford's circle theorems (Euclidean plane geometry)
- Commandino's theorem (geometry)
- Constant chord theorem (geometry)
- Conway circle theorem (Euclidean plane geometry)
- Crossbar theorem (Euclidean plane geometry)
- Dandelin's theorem (solid geometry)
- De Bruijn–Erdős theorem (incidence geometry)
- De Gua's theorem (geometry)
- Desargues's theorem (projective geometry)
- Descartes's theorem (plane geometry)
- Dinostratus' theorem (geometry, analysis)
- Equal incircles theorem (Euclidean geometry)
- Euler's quadrilateral theorem (geometry)
- Euler's theorem in geometry (triangle geometry)
- Exterior angle theorem (triangle geometry)
- Feuerbach's theorem (geometry)
- Finsler–Hadwiger theorem (geometry)
- Five circles theorem (circles)
- Gauss–Wantzel theorem (geometry)
- Geometric mean theorem (geometry)
- Hinge theorem (geometry)
- Hjelmslev's theorem (geometry)
- Impossibility of angle trisection (geometry)
- Independence of the parallel postulate (geometry)
- Inscribed angle theorem (geometry)
- Intercept theorem (Euclidean geometry)
- Intersecting chords theorem (Euclidean geometry)
- Intersecting secants theorem (Euclidean geometry)
- Intersection theorem (projective geometry)
- Japanese theorem for concyclic polygons (Euclidean geometry)
- Japanese theorem for concyclic quadrilaterals (Euclidean geometry)
- Kawasaki's theorem (mathematics of paper folding)
- Lester's theorem (Euclidean plane geometry)
- Lexell's theorem (spherical geometry)
- Menelaus's theorem (geometry)
- Miquel's theorem (geometry)
- Mohr–Mascheroni theorem (geometry)
- Monge's theorem (geometry)
- Morley's trisector theorem (geometry)
- Napoleon's theorem (triangle geometry)
- Newton's theorem about ovals (curves)
- Newton's theorem (quadrilateral) (geometry)
- Pappus's area theorem (geometry)
- Pappus's centroid theorem (geometry)
- Pappus's hexagon theorem (geometry)
- Pascal's theorem (conics)
- Pasch's theorem (order theory)
- Pitot theorem (plane geometry)
- Pivot theorem (circles)
- Pompeiu's theorem (Euclidean geometry)
- Poncelet's closure theorem (conics)
- Poncelet–Steiner theorem (geometry)
- Ptolemy's theorem (geometry)
- Pythagorean theorem (geometry)
- Reuschle's theorem (Euclidean geometry)
- Routh's theorem (triangle geometry)
- Saccheri–Legendre theorem (absolute geometry)
- Six circles theorem (circles)
- Steiner–Lehmus theorem (triangle geometry)
- Symphonic theorem (triangle geometry)
- Tangent-secant theorem (geometry)
- Thales's theorem (geometry)
- Thébault's theorem (geometry)
- Theorem of the gnomon (geometry)
- Thomsen's theorem (geometry)
- Van Aubel's theorem (quadrilaterals)
- Van Schooten's theorem (Euclidean geometry)
- Varignon's theorem (Euclidean geometry)
- Viviani's theorem (Euclidean geometry)

== Convex and discrete geometry ==
- Alexandrov's uniqueness theorem (discrete geometry)
- Balinski's theorem (combinatorics)
- Bang's theorem (geometry)
- Besicovitch covering theorem (mathematical analysis)
- Blaschke selection theorem (geometric topology)
- Bolyai–Gerwien theorem (discrete geometry)
- Busemann's theorem (Euclidean geometry)
- Carathéodory's theorem (convex geometry)
- Cauchy's theorem (geometry)
- Classification of Platonic solids (geometry)
- de Bruijn's theorem (discrete geometry)
- Descartes's theorem on total angular defect (polyhedra)
- Erdős–Anning theorem (discrete geometry)
- Erdős–Nagy theorem (discrete geometry)
- Erdős–Szekeres theorem (discrete geometry)
- Fáry's theorem (graph theory)
- Fenchel's duality theorem (convex analysis)
- Fenchel–Moreau theorem (mathematical analysis)
- Hadwiger's theorem (geometry, measure theory)
- Helly's theorem (convex sets)
- Holditch's theorem (plane geometry)
- John ellipsoid (geometry)
- Jung's theorem (geometry)
- Kepler conjecture (discrete geometry)
- Kirchberger's theorem (discrete geometry)
- Krein–Milman theorem (mathematical analysis, discrete geometry)
- Minkowski's theorem (geometry of numbers)
- Minkowski's second theorem (geometry of numbers)
- Minkowski–Hlawka theorem (geometry of numbers)
- Monsky's theorem (discrete geometry)
- Pick's theorem (geometry)
- Pizza theorem (geometry)
- Radon's theorem (convex sets)
- Separating axis theorem (convex geometry)
- Steinitz theorem (graph theory)
- Stewart's theorem (plane geometry)
- Supporting hyperplane theorem (convex geometry)
- Sylvester–Gallai theorem (plane geometry)
- Szemerédi–Trotter theorem (combinatorics)
- Tverberg's theorem (discrete geometry)
- Vitali covering theorem (measure theory)
- Wallace–Bolyai–Gerwien theorem (discrete geometry)

== Differential geometry ==
- 2π theorem (Riemannian geometry)
- Abel's curve theorem (riemannian geometry)
- Beltrami's theorem (Riemannian geometry)
- Berger–Kazdan comparison theorem (Riemannian geometry)
- Bertrand–Diquet–Puiseux theorem (differential geometry)
- Bishop-Gromov inequality (riemannian geometry)
- Bonnet theorem (differential geometry)
- Carathéodory–Jacobi–Lie theorem (symplectic topology)
- Cartan–Hadamard theorem (Riemannian geometry)
- Cheng's eigenvalue comparison theorem (Riemannian geometry)
- Chern–Gauss–Bonnet theorem (differential geometry)
- Classification of symmetric spaces (Lie theory)
- Darboux's theorem (symplectic topology)
- Euler's theorem (differential geometry)
- Four-vertex theorem (differential geometry)
- Frobenius theorem (foliations)
- Gauss's lemma (riemannian geometry)
- Gauss's Theorema Egregium (differential geometry)
- Gauss–Bonnet theorem (differential geometry)
- Geroch's splitting theorem (differential geometry)
- Gromov's compactness theorem (Riemannian geometry)
- Gromov's compactness theorem (symplectic topology)
- Gromov–Ruh theorem (differential geometry)
- Hilbert's theorem (differential geometry)
- Hopf–Rinow theorem (differential geometry)
- Killing–Hopf theorem (Riemannian geometry)
- Lee Hwa Chung theorem (symplectic topology)
- Lie–Palais theorem (differential geometry)
- Meusnier's theorem (differential geometry)
- Mostow rigidity theorem (differential geometry)
- Myers theorem (differential geometry)
- Myers–Steenrod theorem (differential geometry)
- Nash embedding theorem (differential geometry)
- Non-squeezing theorem (symplectic geometry)
- Rashevsky–Chow theorem (control theory)
- Rauch comparison theorem (Riemannian geometry)
- Schwarz–Ahlfors–Pick theorem (differential geometry)
- Soul theorem (Riemannian geometry)
- Sphere theorem (Riemannian geometry)
- Synge's theorem (Riemannian geometry)
- Toponogov's theorem (Riemannian geometry)

== General topology ==
- Arzelà–Ascoli theorem (functional analysis)
- Baire category theorem (topology, metric spaces)
- Bing metrization theorem (general topology)
- Bolzano–Weierstrass theorem (real analysis, calculus)
- Borsuk–Ulam theorem (topology)
- Brouwer fixed-point theorem (topology)
- Cantor's intersection theorem (real analysis)
- Closed graph theorem (functional analysis)
- Extreme value theorem (calculus)
- Fixed-point theorems in infinite-dimensional spaces
- Hairy ball theorem (algebraic topology)
- Hahn–Mazurkiewicz theorem (continuum theory)
- Heine–Borel theorem (real analysis)
- Heine–Cantor theorem (metric geometry)
- Jordan curve theorem (topology)
- Kuratowski's closure-complement problem (topology)
- Lebesgue covering dimension (dimension theory)
- Metrization theorems (topological spaces)
- Nagata–Smirnov metrization theorem(general topology)
- Netto's theorem (topology)
- Parovicenko's theorem (topology)
- Tietze extension theorem (general topology)
- Tychonoff's theorem (general topology)

== Algebraic topology ==
- Acyclic models theorem (algebraic topology)
- Blakers–Massey theorem (homotopy theory)
- Bott periodicity theorem (homotopy theory)
- Brown's representability theorem (homotopy theory)
- Cellular approximation theorem (algebraic topology)
- Dold–Thom theorem (algebraic topology)
- Eilenberg–Ganea theorem (homological algebra, algebraic topology)
- Eilenberg–Zilber theorem (algebraic topology)
- Euler's polyhedron theorem (polyhedra)
- Excision theorem (homology theory)
- Freudenthal suspension theorem (homotopy theory)
- Hilton–Milnor theorem (algebraic topology)
- Homotopy excision theorem (algebraic topology)
- Hopf theorem (differential topology)
- Hurewicz theorem (algebraic topology)
- Künneth theorem (algebraic topology)
- Invariance of domain (algebraic topology)
- Landweber exact functor theorem (algebraic topology)
- Lefschetz fixed-point theorem (fixed points, algebraic topology)
- Lefschetz–Hopf theorem (topology)
- Leray–Hirsch theorem (algebraic topology)
- Nielsen fixed-point theorem (fixed points)
- Nilpotence theorem (algebraic topology)
- Poincaré duality theorem (algebraic topology of manifolds)
- Seifert–van Kampen theorem (algebraic topology)
- Simplicial approximation theorem (algebraic topology)
- Stallings–Zeeman theorem (algebraic topology)
- Sullivan conjecture (homotopy theory)
- Universal coefficient theorem (algebraic topology)
- Vietoris–Begle mapping theorem (algebraic topology)
- Whitehead theorem (homotopy theory)
- Whitney–Graustein Theorem (algebraic topology)

== Manifolds and cell complexes ==
- Alexander's theorem (knot theory)
- Atiyah–Bott fixed-point theorem (differential topology)
- Bing's recognition theorem (geometric topology)
- Birman short exact sequence (geometric topology)
- Classification of compact surfaces (Topology)
- De Rham's theorem (differential topology)
- Dehn-Nielsen-Baer theorem (geometric topology)
- Donaldson's theorem (differential topology)
- Ehresmann's theorem (differential topology)
- Fáry–Milnor theorem (knot theory)
- Fenchel's theorem (differential geometry)
- H-cobordism theorem (differential topology)
- Hirzebruch signature theorem (topology, algebraic geometry)
- Jordan–Schönflies theorem (geometric topology)
- JSJ theorem (3-manifolds)
- Lickorish twist theorem (geometric topology)
- Lickorish–Wallace theorem (3-manifolds)
- Nielsen realization problem (geometric topology)
- Nielsen-Thurston classification (low-dimensional topology)
- Novikov's compact leaf theorem (foliations)
- Perelman's Geometrization theorem (3-manifolds)
- Poincaré–Hopf theorem (differential topology)
- Poincaré conjecture (topology)
- Preimage theorem (differential topology)
- Reeb sphere theorem (foliations)
- Reidemeister–Singer Theorem (geometric topology)
- Riemann–Roch theorem for smooth manifolds (differential topology)
- Rokhlin's theorem (geometric topology)
- S–cobordism theorem (differential topology)
- Sard's theorem (differential geometry)
- Scott core theorem (3-manifolds)
- Swan's theorem (module theory)
- Tameness theorem (3-manifolds)
- Thom transversality theorem (differential topology)
- Thurston's geometrization theorem (3-manifolds)
- Waldhausen's theorem (geometric topology)
- Whitney embedding theorem (differential manifolds)
- Whitney immersion theorem (differential topology)

== Global analysis, analysis on manifolds ==
- Radó's theorem (harmonic analysis)

== Probability theory and stochastic processes ==
- Bayes' theorem (probability)
- Bertrand's ballot theorem (probability theory, combinatorics)
- Burke's theorem (probability theory, queueing theory)
- Central limit theorem (probability)
- Clark–Ocone theorem (stochastic processes)
- Continuous mapping theorem (probability theory)
- Cramér's theorem (large deviations) (probability)
- Dawson–Gärtner theorem (asymptotic analysis)
- Donsker's theorem (probability theory)
- Doob decomposition theorem (stochastic processes)
- Doob's martingale convergence theorems (stochastic processes)
- Doob–Meyer decomposition theorem (stochastic processes)
- Dudley's theorem (probability)
- Dunford–Pettis theorem (probability theory)
- Fernique's theorem (measure theory)
- Foster's theorem (statistics)
- Freidlin–Wentzell theorem (stochastic processes)
- Girsanov's theorem (stochastic processes)
- Glivenko's theorem (probability)
- Gordon–Newell theorem (queueing theory)
- Hammersley–Clifford theorem (probability)
- Helly–Bray theorem (probability theory)
- Integral representation theorem for classical Wiener space (measure theory)
- Ionescu-Tulcea theorem (probability theory)
- Jackson's theorem (queueing theory)
- Karhunen–Loève theorem (stochastic processes)
- Kolmogorov extension theorem (stochastic processes)
- Kolmogorov's three-series theorem (mathematical series)
- Le Cam's theorem (probability theory)
- Lévy continuity theorem (probability)
- Lévy's modulus of continuity theorem (probability)
- Martingale representation theorem (probability theory)
- Maxwell's theorem (probability theory)
- Optional stopping theorem (probability theory)
- Poisson limit theorem (probability)
- Raikov's theorem (probability)
- Skorokhod's embedding theorem (statistics)
- Skorokhod's representation theorem (statistics)
- Slutsky's theorem (probability theory)
- Theorem of de Moivre–Laplace (probability theory)

== Statistics ==
- Aumann's agreement theorem (statistics)
- Bapat–Beg theorem (statistics)
- Basu's theorem (statistics)
- Berry–Esséen theorem (probability theory)
- Cochran's theorem (statistics)
- Cox's theorem (probability)
- Cramér’s decomposition theorem (statistics)
- De Finetti's theorem (probability)
- FWL theorem (economics)
- Fieller's theorem (statistics)
- Fisher–Tippett–Gnedenko theorem (statistics)
- Gauss–Markov theorem (statistics)
- Glivenko–Cantelli theorem (probability)
- Infinite monkey theorem (probability)
- Lehmann–Scheffé theorem (statistics)
- Lukacs's proportion-sum independence theorem (probability)
- Lyapunov's central limit theorem (probability theory)
- Pickands–Balkema–de Haan theorem (extreme value theory)
- Pitman–Koopman–Darmois theorem (statistics)
- Rao–Blackwell theorem (statistics)
- Sklar's theorem (statistics)
- Wold's theorem (statistics)

== Numerical analysis ==
- Godunov's theorem (numerical analysis)
- Kantorovich theorem (functional analysis)
- Lax–Richtmyer theorem (numerical analysis)
- Lax–Wendroff theorem (numerical analysis)
- Marsaglia's theorem (number theory)

== Computer science ==
- Akra–Bazzi theorem (computer science)
- Art gallery theorem (geometry)
- Determination of the fifth Busy Beaver value (computer science)
- CAP theorem (theoretical computer science)
- Chomsky–Schützenberger enumeration theorem (formal language theory)
- Chomsky–Schützenberger representation theorem (formal language theory)
- Codd's theorem (relational model)
- Compression theorem (computational complexity theory, structural complexity theory)
- Cook's theorem (computational complexity theory)
- Fagin's theorem (computational complexity theory)
- Full employment theorem (theoretical computer science)
- Gap theorem (computational complexity theory)
- Gottesman–Knill theorem (quantum computation)
- Holland's schema theorem (genetic algorithm)
- Immerman–Szelepcsényi theorem (computational complexity theory)
- Karp–Lipton theorem (computational complexity theory)
- Ladner's theorem (computational complexity theory)
- Lamé’s theorem (computational complexity theory)
- Linear speedup theorem (computational complexity theory)
- Master theorem (analysis of algorithms) (recurrence relations, asymptotic analysis)
- Max/min_CSP/Ones_classification_theorems (computational complexity theory)
- Myhill–Nerode theorem (formal languages)
- No free lunch theorem (search and optimization) (computational complexity theory)
- PCP theorem (computational complexity theory)
- Pseudorandom generator theorem (computational complexity theory)
- Quantum threshold theorem (computer science) (theoretical computer science)
- Reversed compound agent theorem (probability)
- Rice's theorem (recursion theory, computer science)
- Rice–Shapiro theorem (computer science)
- Savitch's theorem (computational complexity theory)
- Schaefer's dichotomy theorem (computational complexity theory)
- Sipser–Lautemann theorem (probabilistic complexity theory) (structural complexity theory)
- Smn theorem (recursion theory, computer science)
- Space hierarchy theorem (computational complexity theory)
- Speedup theorem (computational complexity theory)
- Structured program theorem (computer science)
- Time hierarchy theorem (computational complexity theory)
- Toda's theorem (computational complexity theory)
- Universal approximation theorem (artificial neural networks)
- Valiant–Vazirani theorem (computational complexity theory)

== Mechanics of particles and systems ==
- Chasles' theorem (kinematics)
- Chasles' theorem (gravity)
- Helmholtz theorem (classical mechanics) (physics)
- König's theorem (physics)
- Lami's theorem (statics)
- Liouville's theorem (Hamiltonian mechanics)
- Parallel axis theorem (physics)
- Perpendicular axis theorem (physics)
- Virial theorem (classical mechanics)

== Mechanics of deformable solids ==
- Betti's theorem (physics)
- Castigliano's first and second theorems (structural analysis)
- Clapeyron's theorem (physics)
- Saint-Venant's theorem (physics)
- Theorem of three moments (physics)

== Fluid mechanics ==
- Buckingham π theorem (dimensional analysis)
- Helmholtz's theorems (physics)
- Kelvin's circulation theorem (physics)
- Kutta–Joukowski theorem (physics)
- Reynolds transport theorem (fluid dynamics)
- Taylor–Proudman theorem (physics)

== Optics, electromagnetic theory ==
- Blondel's theorem (electric power) (physics)
- Earnshaw's theorem (electrostatics)
- Maximum power theorem (electrical circuits)
- Norton's theorem (electrical networks)
- Optical theorem (physics)
- Poynting's theorem (physics)
- Thévenin's theorem (electrical circuits)

== Classical thermodynamics, heat transfer ==
- Carnot's theorem (thermodynamics)
- Clausius theorem (physics)

== Quantum theory ==
- Adiabatic theorem (physics)
- Bell's theorem (quantum mechanics)
- Bogoliubov–Parasyuk theorem (quantum field theory)
- Byers–Yang theorem (quantum mechanics)
- C-theorem (physics)
- Cluster decomposition theorem (quantum field theory)
- Coleman–Mandula theorem (quantum field theory)
- Elitzur's theorem (quantum field theory, statistical field theory)
- Furry's theorem (quantum field theory)
- Gell-Mann and Low theorem (quantum field theory)
- Gleason's theorem (Hilbert space)
- Goldstone's theorem (physics)
- Haag's theorem (quantum field theory)
- Haag–Łopuszański–Sohnius theorem (physics)
- Hellmann–Feynman theorem (physics)
- Kinoshita–Lee–Nauenberg theorem (quantum field theory)
- Kochen–Specker theorem (physics)
- Kramers' theorem (physics)
- Nielsen–Ninomiya theorem (quantum field theory)
- No-broadcasting theorem (quantum information theory)
- No-cloning theorem (quantum computation)
- No-communication theorem (quantum information theory)
- No-deleting theorem (quantum information theory)
- Optical equivalence theorem (quantum optics)
- Osterwalder–Schrader theorem (physics)
- Pandya theorem (nuclear physics)
- Pomeranchuk's theorem (physics)
- Reeh–Schlieder theorem (local quantum field theory)
- Solovay–Kitaev theorem (quantum computation)
- Spin–statistics theorem (physics)
- Stone–von Neumann theorem (functional analysis, representation theory of the Heisenberg group, quantum mechanics)
- Supersymmetry nonrenormalization theorems (physics)
- Vafa–Witten theorem (physics)
- Weinberg–Witten theorem (quantum field theory)
- Wick's theorem (physics)
- Wigner–Eckart theorem (Clebsch–Gordan coefficients)

== Statistical mechanics, structure of matter ==
- Bohr–van Leeuwen theorem (physics)
- Crooks fluctuation theorem (physics)
- Crystallographic restriction theorem (group theory, crystallography)
- Equipartition theorem (ergodic theory)
- Fluctuation dissipation theorem (physics)
- Fluctuation theorem (statistical mechanics)
- H-theorem (thermodynamics)
- Hohenberg–Kohn theorems (density functional theory)
- Lee–Yang theorem (statistical mechanics)
- Mermin–Wagner theorem (physics)

== Relativity and gravitational theory ==
- Birkhoff's theorem (general relativity)
- Goldberg–Sachs theorem (physics)
- Lovelock's theorem (physics)
- No-hair theorem (physics)
- Odd number theorem (physics)
- Peeling theorem (physics)
- Penrose–Hawking singularity theorems (physics)
- Positive energy theorem (physics)
- Price's theorem (general relativity)

== Astronomy and astrophysics ==
- Clairaut's theorem (physics)
- Shell theorem (physics)

== Operations research, mathematical programming ==
- Analyst's traveling salesman theorem (discrete mathematics)
- Arrival theorem (queueing theory)
- Blum's speedup theorem (computational complexity theory)
- Max flow min cut theorem (graph theory)
- No free lunch theorem (philosophy of mathematics)
- Topkis's theorem (economics)

== Game theory, economics, social and behavioral sciences ==
- Alchian–Allen theorem (economics)
- Arrow's impossibility theorem (game theory)
- Arrow-Lind theorem (welfare economics)
- Bishop–Cannings theorem (economics)
- Bondareva–Shapley theorem (economics)
- Coase theorem (economics)
- Duggan–Schwartz theorem (voting theory)
- Edgeworth's limit theorem (economics)
- Faustman–Ohlin theorem (economics)
- Fisher separation theorem (economics)
- Folk theorem (game theory)
- Fundamental theorem of arbitrage-free pricing (financial mathematics)
- Fundamental theorems of welfare economics (economics)
- Gibbard–Satterthwaite theorem (voting methods)
- Heckscher–Ohlin theorem (economics)
- Holmström's theorem (economics)
- Kuhn's theorem (game theory)
- Lerner symmetry theorem (economics)
- May's theorem (game theory)
- Modigliani–Miller theorem (finance theory)
- Morton's theorem (game theory)
- Moving equilibrium theorem (economics)
- Mutual fund separation theorem (financial mathematics)
- No-trade theorem (economics)
- Rationality theorem (politics)
- Rybczynski theorem (economics)
- Sonnenschein–Mantel–Debreu Theorem (economics)
- Sprague–Grundy theorem (combinatorial game theory)
- Stolper–Samuelson theorem (economics)

== Biology and other natural sciences ==
- Marginal value theorem (biology, optimization)

== Systems theory; control ==
- Artstein's theorem (control theory)
- Krener's theorem (control theory)
- Lyapunov–Malkin theorem (stability theory)
- Orbit theorem (Nagano–Sussmann) (control theory)

== Information and communication, circuits ==
- Kraft–McMillan theorem (coding theory)
- Nyquist–Shannon sampling theorem (information theory)
- Shannon–Hartley theorem (information theory)
- Shannon's source coding theorem (information theory)
- Shannon's theorem (information theory)
- Ugly duckling theorem (computer science)
