= Extension theorem =

Extension theorem may refer to:

- Carathéodory's extension theorem - a theorem in measure theory, named after the Greek mathematician Constantin Carathéodory
- Dugundji extension theorem - a theorem in topology, named after the American mathematician James Dugundji
- Extension Lemma - a lemma in topology (resp. functional analysis), related to the Tietze extension theorem
- Hartogs' extension theorem - a theorem in the theory of functions of several complex variables
- Isomorphism extension theorem - a theorem in field theory
- Kolmogorov extension theorem - a theorem in probability theory, named after the Soviet mathematician Andrey Nikolaevich Kolmogorov
- Krein extension theorem - a theorem in functional analysis, proved by the Soviet mathematician Mark Grigorievich Krein
- M. Riesz extension theorem - a theorem in mathematics, proved by Marcel Riesz
- Ohsawa–Takegoshi L^{2} extension theorem - a theorem in several complex variables, proved by Takeo Ohsawa and Kensho Takegoshi
- Szpilrajn extension theorem - a theorem in set theory, proved by Edward Szpilrajn
- Tietze extension theorem - a theorem in topology, named after the Austrian mathematician Heinrich Franz Friedrich Tietze
- Urysohn extension theorem - a theorem in topology, named after the mathematician Pavel Samuilovich Urysohn
- Whitney extension theorem - a theorem in mathematical analysis, named after the American mathematician Hassler Whitney
- Kreps extension theorem - a theorem in financial mathematics, ensuring that incomplete markets can be completed by adding the right securities
