= Christian Pommerenke =

German mathematician (1933–2024)

Christian Pommerenke (17 December 1933 – 18 August 2024) was a German mathematician known for his work in complex analysis.

== Life and career ==
Pommerenke studied at the University of Göttingen (1954–1958), achieving diploma in mathematics (1957), Ph.D. (1959) on the dissertation Über die Gleichverteilung von Gitterpunkten auf m-dimensionalen Ellipsoiden (1959) and habilitation (1963). Pommerenke subsequently joined the faculty as Assistant (1958–1964) and Privatdozent (1964–1966). Around the same time he served as assistant professor at the University of Michigan in Ann Arbor (1961–1962), was at Harvard University (1962–1963) and was guest lecturer and reader at Imperial College in London (1965–1967). Since 1967 he was professor in complex analysis at the mathematics department of Technische Universität Berlin. He was later an emeritus. His doctoral students include Herbert Robert Stahl, known for proving the Bessis-Moussa-Villani (BMV) conjecture.

Pommerenke died on 18 August 2024, at the age of 90.

== Books ==
- Boundary Behaviour of Conformal Maps. Springer-Verlag. 1992. ISBN 978-3-540-54751-8.
  - Boundary Behaviour of Conformal Maps. Springer Science & Business Media. 9 April 2013. ISBN 978-3-662-02770-7(Reprint of 1992 original)
- Univalent Functions. Vandenhoeck & Ruprecht. 1975. ISBN 978-3525401330. With Gerd Jensen
