= Zahorski =

Zahorski (feminine: Zahorska) may refer to:

== People ==
- Andrzej Zahorski (1923–1995), Polish historian
- Anna Zahorska (1882–1942), Polish poet
- Tomasz Zahorski (born 1984), Polish footballer
- Stefania Zahorska (1890–1961), Polish art historian
- Tiffany Zahorski (born 1994), Russian ice dancer

== Other ==
- Zahorski theorem, a mathematical analysis theorem
