= Bombieri's theorem =

Bombieri's theorem may refer to:

- Bombieri–Vinogradov theorem, a result in analytic number theory
- Schneider–Lang theorem for Bombieri's theorem on transcendental numbers
