= Komura =

Komura or Kōmura is a Japanese surname. Notable people with the surname include:

- Ayumi Komura, Japanese manga artist
- Keizō Komura (1896–1978), Vice Admiral in the Imperial Japanese Navy during World War II
- Komura Jutarō, GCB, GCMG, GCVO (1855–1911), statesman and diplomat in Meiji period Japan
- Masahiko Kōmura (born 1942), Japanese politician of the Liberal Democratic Party

== See also ==
- Kōmura's theorem, result on the differentiability of absolutely continuous Banach space-valued functions
