= Karl Gustav Reuschle =

German mathematician, geographer and educator

Karl Gustav Reuschle (26 December 1812 – 22 May 1875) was a German mathematician, geographer and educator.

Reuschle was born in Mehrstetten in Württemberg and studied math and theology at the University of Tübingen. After his graduation he continued his studies in mathematics for a year in Paris and for a year in Berlin. From 1837 onwards Reuschle worked as a teacher, first in Schöntal then in Tübingen (1938) and finally since 1840 at a gymnasium in Stuttgart, where he taught as professor for mathematics and geography.

Reuschle authored a number of science books, mostly on geography and mathematics. Particularly well received at the time was his biography of Johannes Kepler (1871). His son Karl Reuschle (1847–1909) was a mathematician as well, he became the cofounder of the mathematical seminar at the University of Stuttgart. Reuschle died on 22 May 1875 in Stuttgart.

In elementary geometry Reuschle's theorem is named after him.

== Works ==
- Analytische Theorie der Bewegung des sphaerischen Pendels. Stuttgart 1840
- Vollständiges Lehrbuch der Geographie; mit Einschluß der Hilfkenntnisse nach neuem Plan in zwei selbständigen Theilen. Stuttgart, Schweizerbart, 1852 (2 volumes)
- Illustrierte Geographie für Schule und Haus. Stuttgart 1856
- Handbuch der Geographie. Stuttgart 1859
- Philosophie und Naturwissenschaft. Bonn 1874
- Mathematische Abhandlungen. Stuttgart 1850, 1853
- Die Arithmetik in der Hand des Schülers. Stuttgart 1850
- Kepler und die Astronomie. Frankfurt 1871
- Elemente der Trigonometrie. Stuttgart 1873
- Kosmos für Schule und Laien. Stuttgart 1848 (2 volumes)
- Einführung in die Determinatentheorie: Stuttgart 1884
- Praxis der Kurvendiskussion. Stuttgart 1886
- Tafeln komplexer Primzahlen aus Wurzeln der Einheit gebildet. Berliner Akademie der Wissenschaften 1875
