= Gerhard Thomsen =

German mathematician (1899–1934)

Gerhard Thomsen (23 June 1899 – 4 January 1934) was a German mathematician, probably best known for his work in various branches of geometry.

== Life ==
Thomsen was born on 23 June 1899 in Hamburg. His father, Georg Thomsen, was a physician. Thomsen grew up in Hamburg and attended the Johanneum (gymnasium/highschool) from 1908 to 1917. After completing school he served in the army during the last year of World War I. In 1919 he became of the first students at the newly founded University of Hamburg majoring in mathematics and natural science. Aside from a temporary interlude Thomsen studied in Hamburg until 1923. He received a certification to teach at highschools the fall of 1922 and finally his PhD in the summer of the following year. After he worked shortly as an assistant at the Karlsruhe Institute of Technology before returning to Hamburg in a similar capacity in the spring of 1925. While working on his habilitation thesis Thomsen spend one year in Rome on Rockefeller grant to study with Tullio Levi-Civita. He received his habilitation in Hamburg in 1928 and started a position as a tenured professor at the University of Rostock in the fall of 1929.

On 11 November 1933 Thomsen gave an inflammatory talk entitled "Über die Gefahr der Zurückdrängung der exakten Naturwissenschaften an Schulen und Hochschulen" (On the danger of marginalizing the exact sciences in schools and universities), that received a large amount of publicity in academic circles. While the talk seemed supportive of some aims of the Nazis, it also directly attacked their suppression of education in the sciences. This caused him to be investigated by the Gestapo.

Thomsen was killed by a train on a railroad track in Rostock on 4 January 1934. It is assumed that his death was a suicide possibly triggered by the Gestapo investigation.

== Work ==
In Hamburg Thomsen assisted Wilhelm Blaschke (Thomsen's doctoral advisor) to apply Felix Klein's Erlangen Program on differential geometry. He also edited and organized Blaschke's lectures on differential geometry for publication as a series of three books. Thomsen wrote 22 papers on various topics in geometry and furthermore a few papers on theoretical physics as well. The latter were mostly written in Italian rather than in German. Thomsen also wrote a book on the foundations of elementary geometry.

In elementary geometry Thomsen's theorem is named after him.
