= Xavier Fernique =

Mathematician

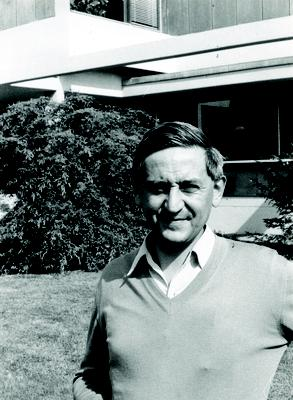
Fernique in 1975

Xavier Fernique (3 May 1934 – 15 March 2020) was a mathematician, noted mostly for his contributions to the theory of stochastic processes. Fernique's theorem, a result on the integrability of Gaussian measures, is named after him.
