= British flag theorem =

On distances from opposite corners to a point inside a rectangle

According to the British flag theorem, the red squares have the same total area as the blue squares

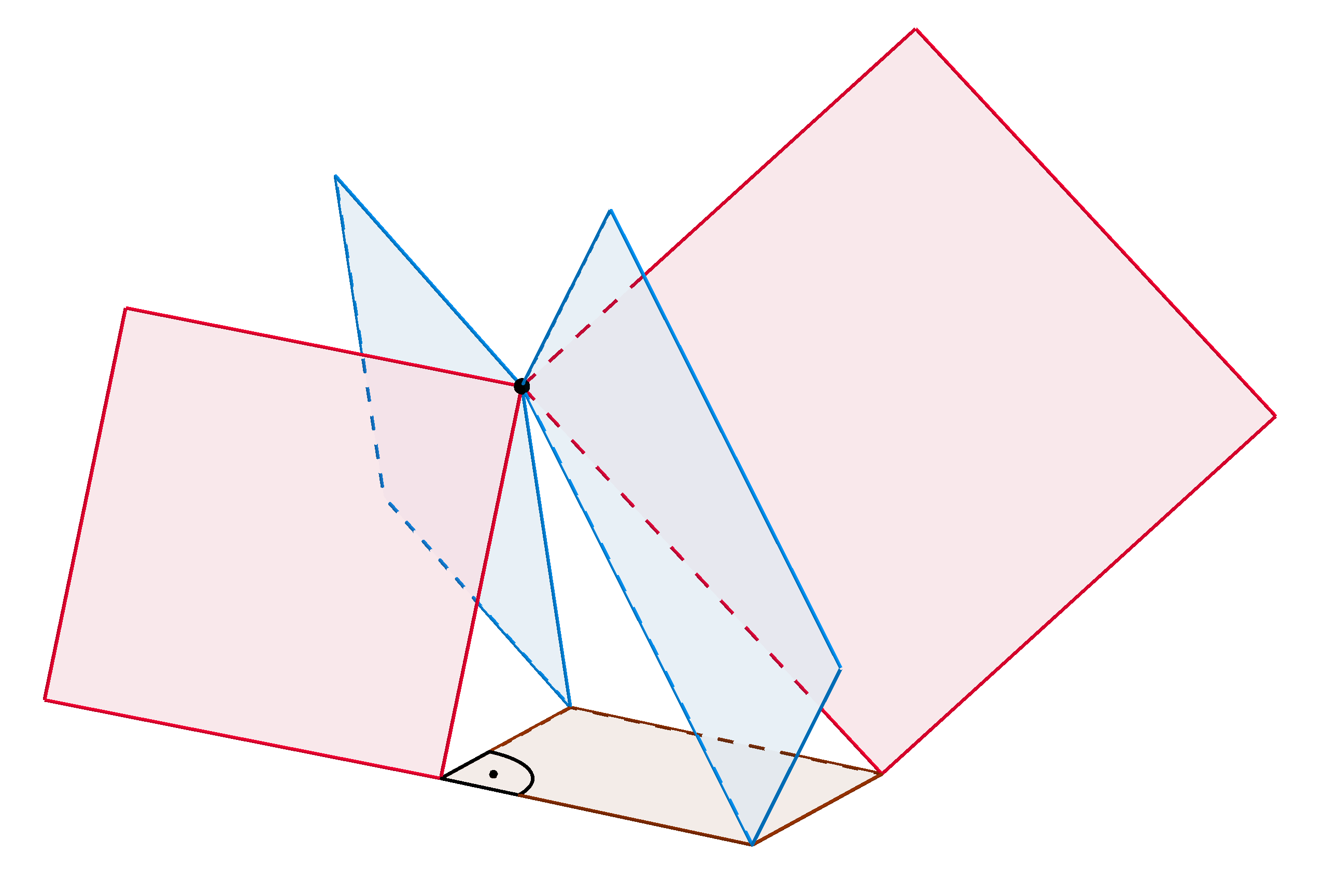
The British flag theorem in space, the red squares have the same total area as the blue squares

In Euclidean geometry, the British flag theorem says that if a point P is chosen inside a rectangle ABCD then the sum of the squares of the Euclidean distances from P to two opposite corners of the rectangle equals the sum to the other two opposite corners. As an equation:
$$AP^2 + CP^2 = BP^2 + DP^2.$$

The theorem also applies to points outside the rectangle, and more generally to the distances from a point in Euclidean space to the corners of a rectangle embedded into the space. Even more generally, if the sums of squares of distances from a point P to the two pairs of opposite corners of a parallelogram are compared, the two sums will not in general be equal, but the difference between the two sums will depend only on the shape of the parallelogram and not on the choice of P.

The theorem can also be thought of as a generalisation of the Pythagorean theorem. Placing the point P on any of the four vertices of the rectangle yields the square of the diagonal of the rectangle being equal to the sum of the squares of the width and length of the rectangle, which is the Pythagorean theorem.

== Proof ==
Illustration for proof

Drop perpendicular lines from the point P to the sides of the rectangle, meeting sides AB, BC, CD, and AD at points W, X, Y and Z respectively, as shown in the figure. These four points WXYZ form the vertices of an orthodiagonal quadrilateral. By applying the Pythagorean theorem to the right triangle AWP, and observing that WP = AZ, it follows that

$$AP^2 = AW^2 + WP^2 = AW^2 + AZ^2$$

and by a similar argument the squares of the lengths of the distances from P to the other three corners can be calculated as

$$PC^2 = WB^2 + ZD^2,$$
$BP^2 = WB^2 + AZ^2,$ and
$$PD^2 = ZD^2 + AW^2.$$

Therefore:

$$\begin{align}
AP^2 + PC^2 &= \left(AW^2 + AZ^2\right) + \left(WB^2 + ZD^2\right) \\[4pt]
&= \left(WB^2 + AZ^2\right) + \left(ZD^2 + AW^2\right) \\[4pt]
&= BP^2 + PD^2
\end{align}$$

== Isosceles trapezoid ==
isosceles trapezoid, red area = blue area

The British flag theorem can be generalized into a statement about (convex) isosceles trapezoids. More precisely for a trapezoid $ABCD$ with parallel sides $AB$ and $CD$ and interior point$P$ the following equation holds:

$$|AP|^2+\frac{|AB|}{|CD|} \cdot |PC|^2=|BP|^2+\frac{|AB|}{|CD|} \cdot |PD|^2$$

In the case of a rectangle the fraction $\tfrac{|AB|}{|CD|}$ evaluates to 1 and hence yields the original theorem.

== Naming ==
The flag of the United Kingdom.

This theorem takes its name from the fact that, when the line segments from P to the corners of the rectangle are drawn, together with the perpendicular lines used in the proof, the completed figure resembles a Union Flag.

== See also ==
- Pizza theorem
