= Thomsen's theorem =

Theorem in geometry

Thomsen's theorem, $P_7=P_1$

Thomsen's theorem, named after Gerhard Thomsen, is a theorem in elementary geometry. It shows that a certain path constructed by line segments being parallel to the edges of a triangle always ends up at its starting point.

Consider an arbitrary triangle ABC with a point P_{1} on its edge BC. A sequence of points and parallel lines is constructed as follows. The parallel line to AC through P_{1} intersects AB in P_{2} and the parallel line to BC through P_{2} intersects AC in P_{3}. Continuing in this fashion the parallel line to AB through P_{3} intersects BC in P_{4} and the parallel line to AC through P_{4} intersects AB in P_{5}. Finally the parallel line to BC through P_{5} intersects AC in P_{6} and the parallel line to AB through P_{6} intersects BC in P_{7}. Thomsen's theorem now states that P_{7} is identical to P_{1} and hence the construction always leads to a closed path P_{1}P_{2}P_{3}P_{4}P_{5}P_{6}P_{1}

Thomsen's theorem can be generalized to quadrilaterals and to any polygon by drawing appropriate parallel lines to diagonals as shown in De Villiers (2009).
