= Branching theorem =

In mathematics, the branching theorem is a theorem about Riemann surfaces. Intuitively, it states that every non-constant holomorphic function is locally a polynomial.

== Statement of the theorem ==
Let $X$ and $Y$ be Riemann surfaces, and let $f : X \to Y$ be a non-constant holomorphic map. Fix a point $a \in X$ and set $b := f(a) \in Y$. Then there exist $k \in \N$ and charts $\psi_{1} : U_{1} \to V_{1}$ on $X$ and $\psi_{2} : U_{2} \to V_{2}$ on $Y$ such that

- $\psi_{1} (a) = \psi_{2} (b) = 0$; and
- $\psi_{2} \circ f \circ \psi_{1}^{-1} : V_{1} \to V_{2}$ is $z \mapsto z^{k}.$

This theorem gives rise to several definitions:

- We call $k$ the multiplicity of $f$ at $a$. Some authors denote this $\nu (f, a)$.
- If $k > 1$, the point $a$ is called a branch point of $f$.
- If $f$ has no branch points, it is called unbranched. See also unramified morphism.
