= Lee Hwa Chung theorem =

Theorem in symplectic topology

The Lee Hwa Chung theorem is a theorem in symplectic topology.

== Statement ==
Lee Hwa Chung theorem—Let M be a symplectic manifold with symplectic form ω. Let α be a differential k-form on M which is invariant for all Hamiltonian vector fields. Then:

- If k is odd, α = 0.
- If k is even, $\alpha = c \times \omega^{\wedge \frac{k}{2}}$, where $c \in \mathbb{R}$.
