= Joubert's theorem =

In polynomial algebra and field theory, Joubert's theorem states that if $K$ and $L$ are fields, $L$ is a separable field extension of $K$ of degree 6, and the characteristic of $K$ is not equal to 2, then $L$ is generated over $K$ by some element λ in $L$, such that the minimal polynomial $p$ of λ has the form $p(t)$ = $t^6 + c_4 t^4 + c_2 t^2 + c_1 t + c_0$, for some constants $c_4, c_2, c_1, c_0$ in $K$. The theorem is named in honor of Charles Joubert, a French mathematician, lycée professor, and Jesuit priest.

In 1867 Joubert published his theorem in his paper Sur l'équation du sixième degré in tome 64 of Comptes rendus hebdomadaires des séances de l'Académie des sciences. He seems to have made the assumption that the fields involved in the theorem are subfields of the complex field.

Using arithmetic properties of hypersurfaces, Daniel F. Coray gave, in 1987, a proof of Joubert's theorem (with the assumption that the characteristic of $K$ is neither 2 nor 3). In 2006 Hanspeter Kraft gave a proof of Joubert's theorem "based on an enhanced version of Joubert’s argument". In 2014 Zinovy Reichstein proved that the condition characteristic($K$) ≠ 2 is necessary in general to prove the theorem, but the theorem's conclusion can be proved in the characteristic 2 case with some additional assumptions on $K$ and $L$.
