= Vantieghems theorem =

In number theory, Vantieghem's theorem is a primality criterion. It states that a natural number n≥3 is prime if and only if

$$\prod_{1 \leq k \leq n-1} \left( 2^k - 1  \right) \equiv n \mod \left(  2^n - 1 \right).$$

Similarly, n is prime, if and only if the following congruence for polynomials in X holds:

$$\prod_{1 \leq k \leq n-1} \left( X^k - 1  \right) \equiv  n- \left( X^n - 1 \right)/\left( X - 1 \right) \mod \left(  X^n - 1 \right)$$

or:

$$\prod_{1 \leq k \leq n-1} \left( X^k - 1  \right) \equiv n \mod \left( X^n - 1 \right)/\left( X - 1 \right).$$

== Example ==
Let n=7 forming the product 1*3*7*15*31*63 = 615195. 615195 = 7 mod 127 and so 7 is prime
Let n=9 forming the product 1*3*7*15*31*63*127*255 = 19923090075. 19923090075 = 301 mod 511 and so 9 is composite
