= Unique homomorphic extension theorem =

The unique homomorphic extension theorem is a result in mathematical logic which formalizes the intuition that the truth or falsity of a statement can be deduced from the truth values of its parts.

== The lemma ==
Let A be a non-empty set, X a subset of A, F a set of functions in A, and $X_+$ the inductive closure of X under F.

Let be B any non-empty set and let G be the set of functions on B, such that there is a function $d:F\to G$ in G that maps with each function f of arity n in F the following function $d(f):B^n\to B$ in G (G cannot be a bijection).

From this lemma we can now build the concept of unique homomorphic extension.

== The theorem ==
If $X_+$ is a free set generated by X and F, for each function $h:X\to B$ there is a single function $\hat h:X_+\to B$ such that:

$$\forall x\in X, \hat h(x)= h(x); \qquad (1)$$

For each function f of arity n > 0, for each $x_1,\ldots,x_n\in X^n_+,$

$$\hat h(f(x_1, \ldots, x_n)) = g(\hat h(x_1),\ldots,\hat h(x_n)), \text{ where } g=d(f) \qquad (2)$$

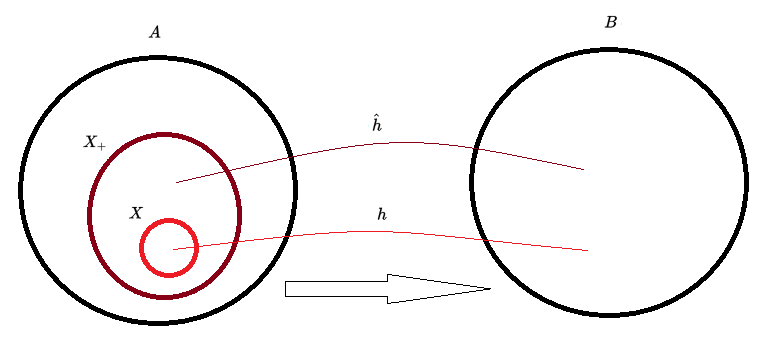

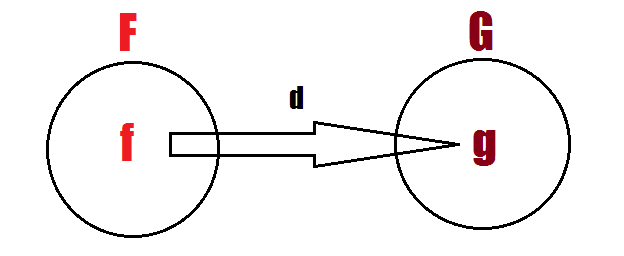

== Consequence ==
The identities seen in (1) e (2) show that $\hat h$ is an homomorphism, specifically named the unique homomorphic extension of $h$. To prove the theorem, two requirements must be met: to prove that the extension ($\hat h$) exists and is unique (assuring the lack of bijections).

=== Proof of the theorem ===
We must define a sequence of functions $h_i:X_i\to B$ inductively, satisfying conditions (1) and (2) restricted to $X_i$. For this, we define $h_0=h$, and given $h_i$ then $h_{i+1}$shall have the following graph:

$${\{(f(x_1,\ldots,x_n),g(h_i(x_1),\ldots,h_i(x_n))) \mid (x_1,\ldots,x_n)\in X^n_i - X^n_{i-1},f\in F\}} \cup {\operatorname{graph}(h_i)} \text{ with } g=d(f)$$

First we must be certain the graph actually has functionality, since $X_+$ is a free set, from the lemma we have $f(x_1,\ldots,x_n)\in X_{i+1} - X_i$ when $(x_1,\ldots,x_n)\in X^n_i - X^n_{i-1},(i\geq 0)$, so we only have to determine the functionality for the left side of the union. Knowing that the elements of G are functions(again, as defined by the lemma), the only instance where $(x,y)\in graph(h_i)$ and $(x,z)\in graph(h_i)$ for some $x\in X_{i+1} - X_i$ is possible is if we have $x=f(x_1,\ldots,x_m)=f'(y_1,\ldots,y_n)$ for some $(x_1,\ldots,x_m)\in X^m_i - X^m_{i-1},(y_1,\ldots,y_n)\in X^n_i - X^n_{i-1}$ and for some generators $f$ and ${f'}$ in $F$.

Since $f(X^m_+)$ and ${f'}(X^n_+)$ are disjoint when $f\neq {f'},f(x_1,\ldots,x_m) = f'(y_1,\ldots,Y_n)$ this implies $f=f'$ and $m=n$. Being all $f\in F$ in $X^n_+$, we must have $x_j=y_j,\forall j,1\leq j\leq n$.

Then we have $y=z=g(x_1,\ldots,x_n)$ with $g=d(f)$, displaying functionality.

Before moving further we must make use of a new lemma that determines the rules for partial functions, it may be written as:

 (3)Be 
  
    
      
        (
        
          f
          
            n
          
        
        
          )
          
            n
            ≥
            0
          
        
      
    
    {\displaystyle (f_{n})_{n\geq 0}}
  
 a sequence of partial functions 
  
    
      
        
          f
          
            n
          
        
        :
        A
        →
        B
      
    
    {\displaystyle f_{n}:A\to B}
  
 such that 
  
    
      
        
          f
          
            n
          
        
        ⊆
        
          f
          
            n
            +
            1
          
        
        ,
        ∀
        n
        ≥
        0
      
    
    {\displaystyle f_{n}\subseteq f_{n+1},\forall n\geq 0}
  
. Then, 
  
    
      
        g
        =
        (
        A
        ,
        ⋃
        g
        r
        a
        p
        h
        (
        
          f
          
            n
          
        
        )
        ,
        B
        )
      
    
    {\displaystyle g=(A,\bigcup graph(f_{n}),B)}
  
 is a partial function.  Archived 2017-07-12 at the Wayback Machine

Using (3), $\hat h =\bigcup_{i\geq 0} h_i$ is a partial function. Since $dom(\hat h)=\bigcup dom(h_i)=\bigcup X_i=X_+$ then $\hat h$ is total in $X_+$.

Furthermore, it is clear from the definition of $h_i$ that $\hat h$ satisfies (1) and (2). To prove the uniqueness of $\hat h$, or any other function ${h'}$ that satisfies (1) and (2), it is enough to use a simple induction that shows $\hat h$ and ${h'}$ work for $X_i,\forall i\geq 0$, and such is proved the Theorem of the Unique Homomorphic Extension.

== Example of a particular case ==
We can use the theorem of unique homomorphic extension for calculating numeric expressions over whole numbers. First, we must define the following:

$A=\Sigma^*$ where $\Sigma= \mathrm{Variables} \cup \{0,1,2,\ldots,9\} \cup \{+,-,*\} \cup \{(,)\}, \text{ where }| *=\mathrm{Variables} \cup \{{0,\ldots,9}\}$

Be $F =\{{f-,f+,f*}\}$

$f:\Sigma^*\to \Sigma^*_{w\mapsto {-w}}$

$f:\Sigma^*x\Sigma^*\to \Sigma^*_{w_1,w_2\mapsto {w_1+w_2}}$

$f:\Sigma^*x\Sigma^*\to \Sigma^*_{w_1,w_2\mapsto {w_1*w_2}}$

Be $EXPR$ he inductive closure of $X$ under $F$ and be$B=\Z, G={\{Soma(-.-),Mult(-,-),Menos(-)}\}$

Be $d:F\to G$

$d({f-})=menos$

$d({f+})=mais$

$d({f*})=mult$

Then $\hat h:X_+\to\{{0,1}\}$ will be a function that calculates recursively the truth-value of a proposition, and in a way, will be an extension of the function $h:X\to\{{0,1}\}$that associates a truth-value to each atomic proposition, such that:

(1)$\hat h (\phi) = h(\phi)$

(2)$\hat h({(\neg\phi)})=NAO(\hat h(\psi))$ (Negation)

$\hat h({(\rho\land \theta)})= E(\hat h(\rho),\hat h(\theta))$ (AND Operator)

$\hat h({(\rho\lor \theta)})= OU(\hat h(\rho),\hat h(\theta))$ (OR Operator)

$\hat h({(\rho\to \theta)})= SE\,ENTAO(\hat h(\rho),\hat h(\theta))$ (IF-THEN Operator)
