= Nagao's theorem =

In mathematics, Nagao's theorem, named after Hirosi Nagao, is a result about the structure of the group of 2-by-2 invertible matrices over the ring of polynomials over a field. It has been extended by Jean-Pierre Serre to give a description of the structure of the corresponding matrix group over the coordinate ring of a projective curve.

== Nagao's theorem ==
For a general ring R let GL_{2}(R) denote the group of invertible 2-by-2 matrices with entries in R, and let R^{*} denote the group of units of R, and let

$$B(R) = \left\lbrace{  \left({\begin{array}{*{20}c} a & b \\ 0 & d \end{array}}\right) : a,d \in R^*, ~ b \in R  }\right\rbrace.$$

Then B(R) is a subgroup of GL_{2}(R).

Nagao's theorem states that in the case that R is the ring K[t] of polynomials in one variable over a field K, the group GL_{2}(R) is the amalgamated product of GL_{2}(K) and B(K[t]) over their intersection B(K).

== Serre's extension ==
In this setting, C is a smooth projective curve C over a field K. For a closed point P of C let R be the corresponding coordinate ring of C with P removed. There exists a graph of groups (G,T) where T is a tree with at most one non-terminal vertex, such that GL_{2}(R) is isomorphic to the fundamental group π_{1}(G,T).
