= Identity theorem for Riemann surfaces =

In mathematics, the identity theorem for Riemann surfaces is a theorem that states that a holomorphic function is completely determined by its values on any subset of its domain that has a limit point.

== Statement of the theorem ==
Let $X$ and $Y$ be Riemann surfaces, let $X$ be connected, and let $f, g : X \to Y$ be holomorphic. Suppose that $f|_{A} = g|_{A}$ for some subset $A \subseteq X$ that has a limit point, where $f|_{A} : A \to Y$ denotes the restriction of $f$ to $A$. Then $f = g$ (on the whole of $X$).
