= Riemann–Roch theorem for smooth manifolds =

Version without requiring the smooth manifolds involved to carry a complex structure

In mathematics, a Riemann–Roch theorem for smooth manifolds is a version of results such as the Hirzebruch–Riemann–Roch theorem or Grothendieck–Riemann–Roch theorem (GRR) without a hypothesis making the smooth manifolds involved carry a complex structure. Results of this kind were obtained by Michael Atiyah and Friedrich Hirzebruch in 1959, reducing the requirements to something like a spin structure.

== Formulation ==
Let X and Y be oriented smooth closed manifolds, and f: X → Y a continuous map. Let v_{f}=f^{*}(TY) − TX in the K-group K(X). If dim(X) ≡ dim(Y) mod 2, then

$$\mathrm{ch}(f_{K*}(x)) = f_{H*}(\mathrm{ch}(x) e^{d(v_f)/2}\hat{A}(v_f)),$$

where ch is the Chern character, d(v_{f}) an element of the integral cohomology group H^{2}(Y, Z) satisfying d(v_{f}) ≡ f^{*} w_{2}(TY)-w_{2}(TX) mod 2, f_{K*} the Gysin homomorphism for K-theory, and f_{H*} the Gysin homomorphism for cohomology. This theorem was first proven by Atiyah and Hirzebruch.

The theorem is proven by considering several special cases. If Y is the Thom space of a vector bundle V over X, then the Gysin maps are just the Thom isomorphism. Then, using the splitting principle, it suffices to check the theorem via explicit computation for line bundles.

If f: X → Y is an embedding, then the Thom space of the normal bundle of X in Y can be viewed as a tubular neighborhood of X in Y, and excision gives a map

$$u:H^*(B(N), S(N)) \to H^*(Y, Y-B(N)) \to H^*(Y)$$

and

$$v:K(B(N), S(N)) \to K(Y, Y-B(N)) \to K(Y)$$.

The Gysin map for K-theory/cohomology is defined to be the composition of the Thom isomorphism with these maps. Since the theorem holds for the map from X to the Thom space of N, and since the Chern character commutes with u and v, the theorem is also true for embeddings. f: X → Y.

Finally, we can factor a general map f: X → Y into an embedding

$$i: X \to Y \times S^{2n}$$

and the projection

$$p: Y \times S^{2n} \to Y.$$

The theorem is true for the embedding. The Gysin map for the projection is the Bott-periodicity isomorphism, which commutes with the Chern character, so the theorem holds in this general case also.

== Corollaries ==
Atiyah and Hirzebruch then specialised and refined in the case X = a point, where the condition becomes the existence of a spin structure on Y. Corollaries are on Pontryagin classes and the J-homomorphism.
