= Quadratics =

- Genre: Instructional
- Written by: Robert G. Dexter
- Directed by: David Chamberlain
- Narrated by: Suzanne Grew Ellis
- Country of origin: Canada
- Original language: English
- No. of episodes: 6

Production
- Producer: David Chamberlain
- Running time: 10 minutes

Original release
- Network: TVOntario
- Release: 1993

Quadratics is a six-part Canadian instructional television series produced by TVOntario in 1993. The miniseries is part of the Concepts in Mathematics series. The program uses computer animation to demonstrate quadratic equations and their corresponding functions in the Cartesian coordinate system.

== Synopsis ==
Each program involves two robots, Edie and Charon, who work on an assembly line in a high-tech factory. The robots discuss their desire to learn about quadratic equations, and they are subsequently provided with lessons that further their education.

== Episodes ==
No.	Title	Prod. code
1	"Zeroes and Roots; a beginning"	BPN 356101
2	"Factoring Quadratics"	BPN 356102
3	"Completing the Square"	BPN 356103
4	"The Quadratic Formula"	BPN 356104
5	"Complex Roots"	BPN 356105
6	"Applications of Quadratics; overview"	BPN 356106
