= Fernique's theorem =

Result about Gaussian measures on Banach spaces

Fernique's theorem is a result about Gaussian measures on Banach spaces. It extends the finite-dimensional result that a Gaussian random variable has exponential tails. The result was proved in 1970 by Xavier Fernique.

== Statement ==
Let (X, || ||) be a separable Banach space. Let μ be a centred Gaussian measure on X, i.e. a probability measure defined on the Borel sets of X such that, for every bounded linear functional ℓ : X → R, the push-forward measure ℓ_{∗}μ defined on the Borel sets of R by

$$( \ell_{\ast} \mu ) (A) = \mu ( \ell^{-1} (A) ),$$

is a Gaussian measure (a normal distribution) with zero mean. Then there exists α > 0 such that

$$\int_{X} \exp ( \alpha \| x \|^{2} ) \, \mathrm{d} \mu (x) < + \infty.$$

A fortiori, μ (equivalently, any X-valued random variable G whose law is μ) has moments of all orders: for all k ≥ 0,

$$\mathbb{E} [ \| G \|^{k} ] = \int_{X} \| x \|^{k} \, \mathrm{d} \mu (x) < + \infty.$$
