= Sobczyk's theorem =

In functional analysis, Sobczyk's theorem is a result concerning the existence of projections in Banach spaces. In its original form, the theorem states that for any separable Banach space containing the space $c_0$ (of sequences converging to zero) as a subspace, there exists a projection from the ambient space onto $c_0$ whose norm is at most $2$. The theorem is not true for general non-separable Banach spaces.

A slightly modified version also commonly referred to as the Sobczyk theorem, deals with the extension of a bounded linear operator. This version asserts that if a Banach space contains a subspace that is linearly isometric to $c_0$, then any bounded linear operator defined on that subspace and taking values in $c_0$ can be extended to the entire space with operator norm at most twice that of the original.

The theorem is named after the American mathematician Andrew Sobczyk, who proved it in 1941.

== Statement ==
=== Original version ===
The original version of the theorem states

Let $X$ be a separable Banach space and $c_0 \subset X$. Then there exists a projection $T \colon X \to c_0$ with norm at most $2$.

=== Extension version ===
The second version of the theorem is as follows

Let $X$ be a separable Banach space and let $Y \subset X$ be a subspace. If $S \colon Y \to c_0$ is a bounded linear operator, then there exists an extension $T \colon X \to c_0$ with $\|T\| \leq 2\|S\|$.

==== Remarks ====
- Choosing $Y = c_0$ and $S$ to be the identity operator recovers the original version as a special case of the extension version.
