= Symmetric hypergraph theorem =

Theorem bounding chromatic number of symmetric graphs

The Symmetric hypergraph theorem is a theorem in combinatorics that puts an upper bound on the chromatic number of a graph (or hypergraph in general). The original reference for this paper is unknown at the moment, and has been called folklore.

== Statement ==
A group $G$ acting on a set $S$ is called transitive if given any two elements $x$ and $y$ in $S$, there exists an element $f$ of $G$ such that $f(x) = y$. A graph (or hypergraph) is called symmetric if its automorphism group is transitive.

Theorem. Let $H = (S, E)$ be a symmetric hypergraph. Let $m = |S|$, and let $\chi(H)$ denote the chromatic number of $H$, and let $\alpha(H)$ denote the independence number of $H$. Then

$$\chi(H) \leq 1 + \frac{\ln{m}}{-\ln{(1-\alpha(H)/m)}}$$

== Applications ==
This theorem has applications to Ramsey theory, specifically graph Ramsey theory. Using this theorem, a relationship between the graph Ramsey numbers and the extremal numbers can be shown (see Graham-Rothschild-Spencer for the details).

The theorem has also been applied to problems involving arithmetic progressions. For instance, let $r_k(n)$ denote the minimum number of colors required so that there exists an $r_k(n)$-coloring of $[1,n]$ that avoids any monochromatic $k$-term arithmetic progression. The Symmetric Hypergraph Theorem can be used to show that

$$r_k(n) < \frac{2n \log n}{\log \log n}(1 + o(1))$$

== See also ==
- Ramsey theory
- Van der Waerden's theorem
