= Reuschle's theorem =

Describes a property of the cevians of a triangle intersecting in a common point

Reuschle's theorem: cevians $AP_a$, $AP_b$ and $AP_c$ intersect in $D$ $AP'_a$, $AP'_b$ and $AP'_c$ intersect in $D'$

In elementary geometry, Reuschle's theorem describes a property of the cevians of a triangle intersecting in a common point and is named after the German mathematician Karl Gustav Reuschle (1812–1875). It is also known as Terquem's theorem after the French mathematician Olry Terquem (1782–1862), who published it in 1842.

In a triangle $ABC$ with its three cevians intersecting in a common point other than the vertices $A$, $B$ or $C$ let $P_a$, $P_b$ and $P_c$ denote the intersections of the (extended) triangle sides and the cevians. The circle defined by the three points $P_a$, $P_b$ and $P_c$ intersects the (extended) triangle sides in the (additional) points $P'_a$, $P'_b$ and $P'_c$. Reuschle's theorem now states that the three new cevians $AP'_a$, $BP'_b$ and $CP'_c$ intersect in a common point as well.
