= Zahorski theorem =

Theorem of real analysis

In mathematics, Zahorski's theorem is a theorem of real analysis. It states that a necessary and sufficient condition for a subset of the real line to be the set of points of non-differentiability of a continuous real-valued function, is that it be the union of a G_{δ} set and a ${G_\delta}_\sigma$ set of zero measure.

This result was proved by Zygmunt Zahorski in 1939 and first published in 1941.
