= Kōmura's theorem =

Mathematical theorem

In mathematics, Kōmura's theorem is a result on the differentiability of absolutely continuous Banach space-valued functions, and is a substantial generalization of Lebesgue's theorem on the differentiability of the indefinite integral, which is that Φ : [0, T] → R given by

$$\Phi(t) = \int_{0}^{t} \varphi(s) \, \mathrm{d} s,$$

is differentiable at t for almost every 0 < t < T when φ : [0, T] → R lies in the L^{p} space L^{1}([0, T]; R).

== Statement ==
Let (X, || ||) be a reflexive Banach space and let φ : [0, T] → X be absolutely continuous. Then φ is (strongly) differentiable almost everywhere, the derivative φ′ lies in the Bochner space L^{1}([0, T]; X), and, for all 0 ≤ t ≤ T,

$$\varphi(t) = \varphi(0) + \int_{0}^{t} \varphi'(s) \, \mathrm{d} s.$$
