= Isomorphism extension theorem =

Theorem in field theory

In field theory, a branch of mathematics, the isomorphism extension theorem is an important theorem regarding the extension of a field isomorphism to a larger field.

== Isomorphism extension theorem ==
The theorem states that given any field $F$, an algebraic extension field $E$ of $F$ and an isomorphism $\phi$ mapping $F$ onto a field $F'$ then $\phi$ can be extended to an isomorphism $\tau$ mapping $E$ onto an algebraic extension $E'$ of $F'$ (a subfield of the algebraic closure of $F'$).

The proof of the isomorphism extension theorem in its most general setting, i.e. for the case of a field extension of infinite degree, depends on Zorn's lemma.
