= Schneider–Lang theorem =

In mathematics, the Schneider–Lang theorem is a refinement by Lang (1966) of a theorem of Schneider (1949) about the transcendence of values of meromorphic functions. The theorem implies both the Hermite–Lindemann and Gelfond–Schneider theorems, and implies the transcendence of some values of elliptic functions and elliptic modular functions.

== Statement ==
Fix a number field K and meromorphic f_{1}, ..., f_{N}, of which at least two are algebraically independent and have orders ρ_{1} and ρ_{2}, and such that f_{j}′ ∈ K[f_{1}, ..., f_{N}] for any j. Then there are at most

$$(\rho_1+\rho_2) [K:\mathbb{Q}] \,$$

distinct complex numbers ω_{1}, ..., ω_{m} such that f_{i}(ω_{j}) ∈ K for all combinations of i and j.

== Examples ==
- If f_{1}(z) = z and f_{2}(z) = e^{z} then the theorem implies the Hermite–Lindemann theorem that e^{α} is transcendental for nonzero algebraic α: otherwise, α, 2α, 3α, ... would be an infinite number of values at which both f_{1} and f_{2} are algebraic.
- Similarly taking f_{1}(z) = e^{z} and f_{2}(z) = e^{βz} for β irrational algebraic implies the Gelfond–Schneider theorem that if α and α^{β} are algebraic, then α ∈ {0,1}: otherwise, log(α), 2log(α), 3log(α), ... would be an infinite number of values at which both f_{1} and f_{2} are algebraic.
- Recall that the Weierstrass P function satisfies the differential equation

$$\wp'(z)^2 = 4\wp(z)^3-g_2\wp(z)-g_3. \,$$

Taking the three functions to be z, ℘(αz), ℘′(αz) shows that, for any algebraic α, if g_{2}(α) and g_{3}(α) are algebraic, then ℘(α) is transcendental.

- Taking the functions to be z and e^{f(z)} for a polynomial f of degree ρ shows that the number of points where the functions are all algebraic can grow linearly with the order ρ = deg f.

== Proof ==
To prove the result Lang took two algebraically independent functions from f_{1}, ..., f_{N}, say, f and g, and then created an auxiliary function F ∈ K[ f, g]. Using Siegel's lemma, he then showed that one could assume F vanished to a high order at the ω_{1}, ..., ω_{m}. Thus a high-order derivative of F takes a value of small size at one such ω_{i}s, "size" here referring to an algebraic property of a number. Using the maximum modulus principle, Lang also found a separate estimate for absolute values of derivatives of F. Standard results connect the size of a number and its absolute value, and the combined estimates imply the claimed bound on m.

== Bombieri's theorem ==
Bombieri & Lang (1970) and Bombieri (1970) generalized the result to functions of several variables. Bombieri showed that if K is an algebraic number field and f_{1}, ..., f_{N} are meromorphic functions of d complex variables of order at most ρ generating a field K(f_{1}, ..., f_{N}) of transcendence degree at least d + 1 that is closed under all partial derivatives, then the set of points where all the functions f_{n} have values in K is contained in an algebraic hypersurface in C^{d} of degree at most

$$d((d+1)\rho[K:\mathbb{Q}]+1).$$

Waldschmidt (1979, theorem 5.1.1) gave a simpler proof of Bombieri's theorem, with a slightly stronger bound of d(ρ_{1} + ... + ρ_{d+1})[K:Q] for the degree, where the ρ_{j} are the orders of d + 1 algebraically independent functions. The special case d = 1 gives the Schneider–Lang theorem, with a bound of (ρ_{1} + ρ_{2})[K:Q] for the number of points.

=== Example ===
If $p$ is a polynomial with integer coefficients then the functions $z_1,...,z_n,e^{p(z_1,...,z_n)}$ are all algebraic at a dense set of points of the hypersurface $p=0$.
