= List of things named after Hermann Minkowski =

This is a list of things named after Hermann Minkowski (1864 - 1909), German mathematician:

== Mathematics ==
- Brunn–Minkowski theorem
- Hasse–Minkowski theorem
- Hermite–Minkowski theorem
- Minkowski addition
- Minkowski content
- Minkowski distance
- Minkowski functional
- Minkowski inequality
- Minkowski model
- Minkowski plane
- Minkowski problem
- Minkowski problem for polytopes
- Minkowski sausage
  - Minkowski island
  - Minkowski snowflake
- Minkowski space (number field)
- Minkowski's bound
- Minkowski's first inequality for convex bodies
- Minkowski's question mark function
- Minkowski's second theorem
- Minkowski's theorem in geometry of numbers
- Minkowski–Bouligand dimension
  - Minkowski cover
- Minkowski–Hlawka theorem
- Minkowski–Steiner formula
- Smith–Minkowski–Siegel mass formula
- M-matrices

== Physics ==
- Abraham–Minkowski controversy
- Minkowski diagram
- Minkowski space
- Minkowski superspace

== Other ==
- Minkowski (crater)
- The main-belt asteroid 12493 Minkowski
- The character George Minkowski, from Lost.
- The character Renée Minkowski, from sci-fi audiodrama podcast Wolf 359.
- In the science fiction novel The Chronoliths, by Robert Charles Wilson, "Minkowski ice" is used as an explanatory metaphor for time travel that does not require wholesale changes in the timeline.
