= Blichfeldt's theorem =

High-area shapes can shift to hold many grid points

Blichfeldt's theorem, in the form that every plane set of area $A$ (here, an ellipse with area $\pi$) contains at least $\lceil A\rceil$ points (here, $\lceil\pi\rceil=4$ points), all of whose coordinates differ from each other by integers. The theorem is proved by cutting the set up by squares of the integer grid (top), translating each piece by an integer translation vector into a single unit square, finding a point in that unit square that is covered by many pieces (middle), and using the preimages of this point as the desired points (bottom).

Blichfeldt's theorem is a mathematical theorem in the geometry of numbers, stating that whenever a bounded set in the Euclidean plane has area $A$, it can be shifted to include at least $\lceil A\rceil$ points of the integer lattice. Equivalently, every bounded set of area $A$ contains a set of $\lceil A\rceil$ points whose coordinates all differ by integers.

This theorem can be generalized to other lattices and to higher dimensions, and can be interpreted as a continuous version of the pigeonhole principle. It is named after Danish-American mathematician Hans Frederick Blichfeldt, who published it in 1914. Some sources call it Blichfeldt's principle or Blichfeldt's lemma.

== Statement and proof ==
The theorem can be stated most simply for points in the Euclidean plane, and for the integer lattice in the plane. For this version of the theorem, let $S$ be any bounded and measurable set, let $A$ denote its area, and round this number up to the next integer value, $n=\lceil A\rceil$. Then Blichfeldt's theorem states that $S$ can be translated so that its translated copy contains at least $n$ points with integer coordinates.

The basic idea of the proof is to cut $S$ into pieces along the boundaries of the unit squares of the integer lattice. Then, translate each of those pieces by an integer vector so that they all move into the same unit square. This translation may cause some points of the unit square to be covered more than once. From the assumption that $S$ is bounded, each point is covered only finitely many times. If the combined area of the translated pieces is counted with multiplicity (counting each point by the number of times it is covered) it remains equal to $A$. On the other hand, if the whole unit square were covered with multiplicity at most $n-1$ its area would be at most $n-1$, less than $A$. Therefore, some point $p$ of the unit square must be covered with multiplicity at least $n$. A translation that takes $p$ to the origin will take the $n$ points of $S$ that covered $p$ to integer points, which is what was required.

More generally, the theorem applies to $d$-dimensional bounded sets $S$, with $d$-dimensional volume $A$, and to an arbitrary $d$-dimensional lattice $\Lambda$ (the affine transformation of an integer grid). Just as the integer lattice divides the plane into squares, an arbitrary lattice divides its space into fundamental regions (called parallelotopes) with the property that any one of these regions can be translated onto any other of them by adding the coordinates of a unique lattice point. If $L$ is the $d$-dimensional volume of one of parallelotopes, then Blichfeldt's theorem states that $S$ can be translated to include at least $\lceil A/L\rceil$ points of $\Lambda$. The proof is as before: cut up $S$ by parallelotopes, translate the pieces by translation vectors in $\lambda$ onto a single parallelotope without changing the total volume (counted with multiplicity), observe that there must be a point $p$ of multiplicity at least $\lceil A/L\rceil$, and use a translation that takes $p$ to the origin.

Instead of asking for a translation for which there are $n$ lattice points, an equivalent form of the theorem states that $S$ itself contains a set of $n$ points, all of whose pairwise differences belong to the lattice. A strengthened version of the theorem applies to compact sets, and states that they can be translated to contain at least $\lfloor A+1\rfloor$ points of the lattice. This number of points differs from $\lceil A\rceil$ only when $A$ is an integer, for which it is larger by one.

== Applications ==
=== Minkowski's theorem ===
Minkowski's theorem, proved earlier than Blichfeldt's work by Hermann Minkowski, states that any convex set in the plane that is centrally symmetric around the origin and has area greater than four (or any compact symmetric set with area equal to four) contains a nonzero integer point. More generally, for a $d$-dimensional lattice $\Lambda$ whose fundamental parallelotopes have volume $L$, any set centrally symmetric around the origin with volume greater than $2^d L$ contains a nonzero lattice point.

Although Minkowski's original proof was different, Blichfeldt's theorem can be used in a simple proof of Minkowski's theorem. Let $X$ be any centrally symmetric set with volume greater than $2^d L$ that meets the conditions of Minkowski's theorem, and scale it down by a factor of two to obtain a set $\tfrac{1}{2}X$ of volume greater than $L$. By Blichfeldt's theorem, $\tfrac{1}{2}X$ has two points $p$ and $q$ whose coordinatewise difference belongs to $L$. Reversing the shrinking operation, $2p$ and $2q$ belong to $X$. By symmetry, $-2q$ also belongs to $X$, and by convexity, the midpoint of $2p$ and $-2q$ belongs to $X$. But this midpoint is $p-q$, a nonzero point of $L$.

=== Other applications ===
An example of the increased power of Blichfeldt's theorem over Minkowski's theorem for finding lattice points in non-convex sets. The (closed) yellow set $Y$ on the left has area 1, so can be translated to cover two points of any lattice whose fundamental region has volume 1, such as the red lattice. Therefore, the blue set $X=Y-Y$ on the left, the set of differences of pairs of points in $Y$, when centered on the origin, contains a nonzero lattice point, and can be translated to cover two lattice points. In contrast, the blue rectangle $K$ on the right, the largest convex subset of $X$, has area too small for Minkowski's theorem to guarantee that it contains a nonzero lattice point, and the yellow rectangle $\tfrac{1}{2}K$ within it is too small for Blichfeldt's theorem to find two points in it.

Many applications of Blichfeldt's theorem involve finding a nonzero lattice point in a large-enough set $X$, without imposing the assumption of convexity needed in Minkowski's theorem. One method for doing this would be to find the largest centrally symmetric convex subset $K$ of $X$, and then to apply Minkowski's theorem to $K$, but this does not always give the strongest possible bounds on how big $X$ needs to be to ensure that it contains a lattice point. In applying Minkowski's theorem, one uses a scaled copy $\tfrac{1}{2}K$ of $K$: any two lattice points in $\tfrac{1}{2}K$ have a nonzero lattice point difference in $K$ and therefore in $X$. It may be possible, instead, to find a subset $Y\subset X$, larger than $\tfrac{1}{2}K$, with the same property that its pairwise differences belong to $X$. When this is the case, the larger size of $Y$ relative to $\tfrac{1}{2}K$ leads to tighter bounds on how big $X$ needs to be sure of containing a lattice point.

For a centrally symmetric star domain, it is possible to use the calculus of variations to find the largest set $X'$ whose pairwise differences belong to $X$. Applications of this method include simultaneous Diophantine approximation, the problem of approximating a given set of irrational numbers by rational numbers that all have the same denominators.

== Generalizations ==
Analogues of Blichfeldt's theorem have been proven for other sets of points than lattices, showing that large enough regions contain many points from these sets. These include a theorem for Fuchsian groups (certain lattice-like subsets of $2\times 2$ matrices) and for the sets of vertices of Archimedean tilings.

Other generalizations replace the set $S$ by a measurable function and prove that its sum over some set of translated lattice points is at least as large as its integral, or replace the single set $S$ with a family of sets.

== Computational complexity ==
A computational problem related to Blichfeldt's theorem has been shown to be complete for the PPP complexity class, and therefore unlikely to be solvable in polynomial time. The problem takes as input a set of integer vectors forming the basis of a $d$-dimensional lattice $\Lambda$, and a set $S$ of integer vectors, represented implicitly by a Boolean circuit for testing whether a given vector belongs to $S$. It is required that the cardinality of $S$, divided by the volume of the fundamental parallelotope of $\Lambda$, is at least one, from which a discrete version of Blichfeldt's theorem implies that $S$ includes a pair of points whose difference belongs to $\Lambda$. The task is to find either such a pair, or a point of $S$ that itself belongs to $\Lambda$. The computational hardness of this task motivates the construction of a candidate for a collision-resistant cryptographic hash function.

== See also ==
- Dot planimeter, a device for estimating the area of a shape by counting the lattice points that it contains
- Pick's theorem, a more precise relationship between area and lattice points covered by a polygon with lattice-point vertices
