= Hans Frederick Blichfeldt =

Danish-American mathematician

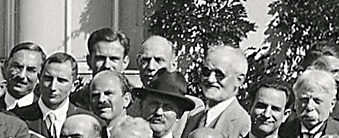
H.F. Blichfeldt (mid of top row, partly obscured by Țițeica's hat) at the International Congress of Mathematicians, Zürich 1932

Hans Frederick Blichfeldt (1873–1945) was a Danish-American mathematician at Stanford University, known for his contributions to group theory, the representation theory of finite groups, the geometry of numbers, sphere packing, and quadratic forms. He is the namesake of Blichfeldt's theorem.

== Life ==
Blichfeldt was one of five children of a Danish farming couple, Erhard Christoffer Laurentius Blichfeldt and Nielsine Maria Schlaper; many of his father's ancestors were ministers. He was born on January 9, 1873, in Iller, a village in the Sønderborg Municipality of Denmark. In 1881, the family moved to Copenhagen. In 1888, he passed with high honors the entrance examinations for the University of Copenhagen, but his family was unable to afford sending him to the university. Instead, later the same year, they moved again to the US. He worked for several years as a lumberman, a railway worker, a traveling surveyor, and then as a government draftsman in Bellingham, Washington.

In 1894, he became a student at Stanford University, which admitted its first students in 1891 and did not charge tuition at the time. He did not have a high school diploma, so he had to be admitted as a special student, with a letter of support from his drafting supervisor. By 1895 he had become a regular student, and he earned a bachelor's degree there in 1896, one of three graduating mathematics students that year. He stayed for a master's degree in 1897, and in the same year was appointed an instructor at Stanford. It was customary to travel to Europe for doctoral study in mathematics, and with financial support from Stanford professor Rufus L. Green he traveled to Leipzig University and completed a Ph.D. there in 1898. His doctoral dissertation, On a Certain Class of Groups of Transformation in Three-dimensional Space, was supervised by Sophus Lie, and he graduated summa cum laude. Eric Temple Bell suggests that he may have chosen to work with Lie, among other famous mathematicians of the time, because of their shared Scandinavian heritage, and by doing so he set the course of his life's work.

Returning to Stanford, he became a full professor by 1913, and department chair from 1927 until his retirement in 1938. He also visited the University of Chicago in 1911 and Columbia University in 1924 and 1925, represented the US at the International Congress of Mathematicians in 1932 and 1936, and served as vice-president of the American Mathematical Society in 1912.

Blichfeldt remained unmarried throughout his life. He died on November 16, 1945, in Palo Alto, California, of complications following an operation for a heart attack.

== Contributions ==
Blichfeldt made his first mathematical publication, on Heronian triangles, as an undergraduate in 1896.^{[A1]}

Blichfeldt's work in group theory includes an improved bound for the Jordan–Schur theorem, that finite linear groups have normal abelian subgroups of index bounded by a function of their dimension,^{[A2]} and a result relating the order of a permutation group to the numbers of fixed points of its elements.^{[A3]} With George Abram Miller and Leonard Eugene Dickson, Blichfeldt wrote a comprehensive 1916 text on what was known at the time in the theory of finite groups.^{[B1]} It was divided into three parts by the specializations of the authors: Miller contributed material on abstract groups and permutation groups, Dickson described Galois groups, and Blichfeldt wrote the portions of the book concerning groups of complex linear transformations (in modern terms, the representation theory of finite groups). Blichfeldt's own book, published a year later,^{[B2]} expanded his exposition of linear transformation groups. Both books detail his classification of the four-dimensional group representations.

Blichtfeld's later work largely concerned lattices, the geometry of numbers, sphere packings, and quadratic forms. According to Blichfeldt's theorem, which he published in 1914, any bounded subset of an $n$-dimensional Euclidean space of $n$-dimensional volume $V$ can be translated to cover at least $\lceil V\rceil$ integer points.^{[A4]} In a 1929 paper, Blichfeldt improved the bounds on the Hermite constant for shortest vectors in a lattice.^{[A5]} The same result can also be interpreted as bounding the density of sphere packings, and in his 1935 study on the minimum nonzero values attained by quadratic forms with integer arguments,^{[A6]} he proved the optimality of the E_{8} lattice as a lattice packing in eight dimensions, a result generalized by the 2016 proof by Maryna Viazovska that it is optimal among all eight-dimensional sphere packings.

== Recognition ==
Blichfeldt was elected to the National Academy of Sciences in 1920, and served on the National Research Council from 1924 to 1927. He was also made a knight in the Order of the Dannebrog in 1938.

== Selected publications ==
=== Articles ===
A1.	Blichfeldt, H. F. (1896), "On triangles with rational sides and having rational areas", Annals of Mathematics, 11 (1/6): 57–60, doi:10.2307/1967214, JSTOR 1967214

A2.	Blichfeldt, H. F. (1903), "On the order of linear homogeneous groups", Transactions of the American Mathematical Society, 4 (4): 387–397, doi:10.2307/1986408, JSTOR 1986408, MR 1500649

A3.	Blichfeldt, H. F. (1904), "A theorem concerning the invariants of linear homogeneous groups, with some applications to substitution-groups", Transactions of the American Mathematical Society, 5 (4): 461–466, doi:10.2307/1986275, JSTOR 1986275, MR 1500684

A4.	Blichfeldt, H. F. (1914), "A new principle in the geometry of numbers, with some applications", Transactions of the American Mathematical Society, 15 (3): 227–235, doi:10.1090/S0002-9947-1914-1500976-6, JSTOR 1988585, MR 1500976

A5.	Blichfeldt, H. F. (1929), "The minimum value of quadratic forms, and the closest packing of spheres", Mathematische Annalen, 101 (1): 605–608, doi:10.1007/BF01454863, MR 1512555, S2CID 123648492

A6.	Blichfeldt, H. F. (1935), "The minimum values of positive quadratic forms in six, seven and eight variables", Mathematische Zeitschrift, 39 (1): 1–15, doi:10.1007/BF01201341, MR 1545485, S2CID 123471916

=== Books ===
B1.	Miller, G. A.; Blichfeldt, H. F.; Dickson, L. E. (1916), "Theory and Applications of Finite Groups", Nature, 98 (2456), New York: Wiley: 225, Bibcode:1916Natur..98..225G, doi:10.1038/098225b0, S2CID 305145

B2.	Blichfeldt, H. F. (1917), Finite Collineation Groups, Chicago: University of Chicago Press
