= Jean Leurechon =

French Jesuit priest, astronomer and mathematician

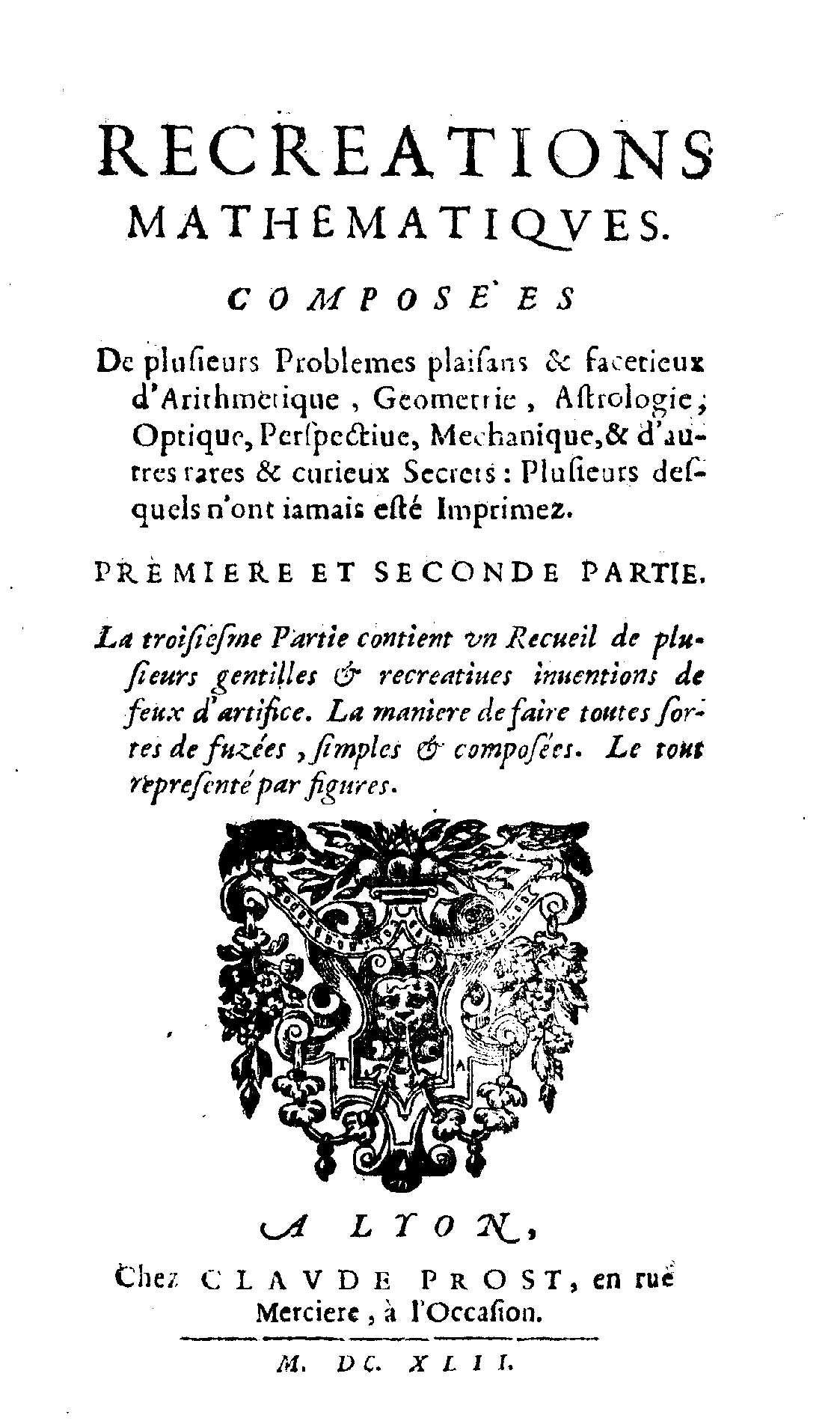
Récréations mathématiques, 1642

Jean Leurechon (c. 1591 – 17 January 1670) was a French Jesuit priest, astronomer, and mathematician, known for inventing the pigeonhole principle and naming the thermometer.

== Life ==
Leurechon was born in Bar-le-Duc where his father, also named Jean Leurechon, was a physician to the Duke of Lorraine. He sent Leurechon to be educated at the Jesuit university in Pont-à-Mousson but, learning of Leurechon's desire to take holy orders and wishing him instead to become a physician, brought him back to Bar-le-Duc. In 1609 Leurechon ran away from home to return to the Jesuits, and the story goes that this so enraged his mother that she took up a dagger and attempted to assassinate the head of the local Jesuit order. His father appealed to the parliament in Paris, which had jurisdiction over Pont-à-Mousson, and Leurechon was returned again to Bar-le-Duc, where the Duke ordered Leurechon to be held at the convent of the Minims in Nancy. This did not change his resolve, and after a month his parents let him go.

Leurechon taught mathematics from 1614 to 1629 at Pont-à-Mousson, and in 1631 became rector of the Collège Gilles de Trèves, a Jesuit school in Bar-le-Duc. This position reconciled him with his parents, who willed their estate to the Jesuits. At Bar-le-Duc, he also took the confessions of Charles IV, Duke of Lorraine.

From 1649 to 1655 he worked in an army chapel in Brussels. He died on 17 January 1670 in Pont-à-Mousson.

== Works ==
After two earlier works on astronomy, in 1619 Leurechon published two works on a comet that became visible in November and December of 1618. In 1622 he published the book Selectæ Propositiones in Tota Sparsim Mathematica Pulcherrimæ. Another book, Récréations Mathématiques, concerning recreational mathematics, was published in 1624 at Pont-à-Mousson under the name H. van Etten, described in the dedication of the book as a student at Pont-à-Mousson. It has been commonly attributed to Leurechon, and the van Etten name interpreted either as a pseudonym or as a "modest" misattribution, but this has been disputed by some scholars. Albrecht Heeffer proposed that the actual author was Jean Appier Hanzelet. It was republished in many later editions.

The 1622 book contained a brief reference to the pigeonhole principle, much earlier than its common attribution to Peter Gustav Lejeune Dirichlet in 1834, and the 1624 book spelled out the principle in more detail. The 1624 book also contained the first use of the word "thermometer", replacing an earlier word "thermoscope" for the same device.
