= Hermann Minkowski =

German mathematician and physicist (1864–1909)

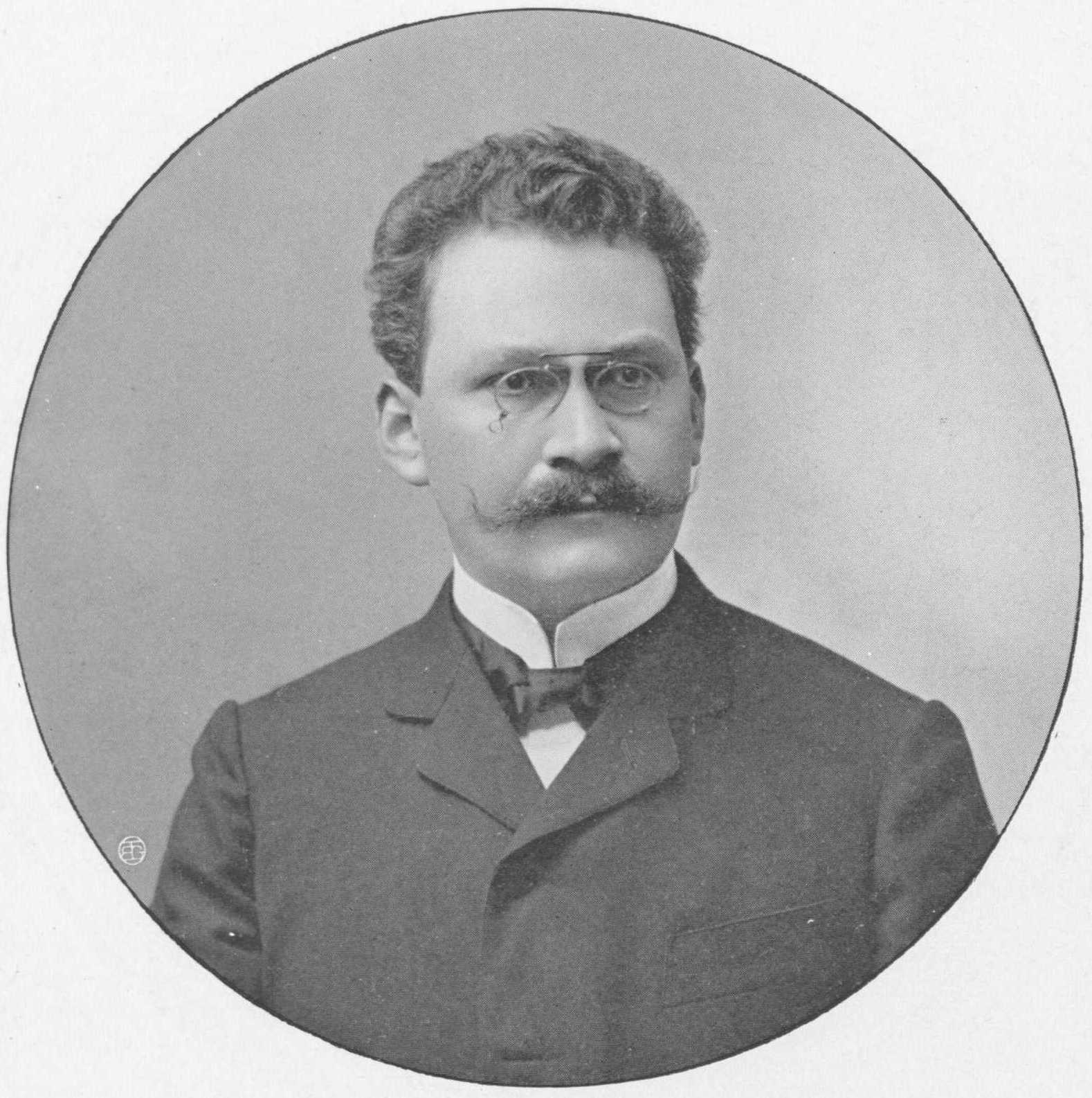
- Born: 22 June 1864; Aleksotas, Suwałki Governorate, Kingdom of Poland (now in Kaunas, Lithuania)
- Died: 12 January 1909 (aged 44); Göttingen, German Empire
- Education: Albertina University of Königsberg
- Known for: Geometry of numbers; Minkowski content; Minkowski diagram; Minkowski's question-mark function; Minkowski space; Electromagnetic stress–energy tensor; Work on the Diophantine approximations
- Spouse: Auguste Adler
- Children: 2
- Scientific career
- Fields: Mathematics, physics, philosophy
- Workplaces: University of Göttingen and ETH Zurich
- Doctoral advisor: Ferdinand von Lindemann
- Doctoral students: Constantin Carathéodory; Louis Kollros; Dénes Kőnig

Hermann Minkowski (Note: /mɪŋˈkɔːfski, -ˈkɒf-/ ming-KAWF-skee, -KOF-; Polish: [miŋˈkɔfskʲi]; German: [mɪŋˈkɔfski]) (22 June 1864 – 12 January 1909) was a mathematician and professor at the University of Königsberg, ETH Zürich, and the University of Göttingen, described variously as German, Polish, Lithuanian-German, or Russian. He created and developed the geometry of numbers and elements of convex geometry, and used geometrical methods to solve problems in number theory, mathematical physics, and the theory of relativity.

Minkowski is perhaps best known for his foundational work describing space and time as a four-dimensional space, now known as "Minkowski spacetime", which facilitated geometric interpretations of Albert Einstein's special theory of relativity (1905).

== Personal life and family ==
Hermann Minkowski was born in the town of Aleksotas, the Suwałki Governorate, the Kingdom of Poland, since 1864 part of the Russian Empire, to Lewin Boruch Minkowski, a merchant who subsidized the building of the choral synagogue in Kovno, and Rachel Taubmann, both Jewish. Hermann was a younger brother of the medical researcher Oskar (born 1858). In different sources Minkowski's nationality is variously given as German, Polish, or Lithuanian-German, or Russian.

To escape Jewish persecution in the Russian Empire, the family moved to Königsberg in 1872, where the father became involved in rag export and later in manufacture of mechanical clockwork tin toys (he operated his firm Lewin Minkowski & Son with his eldest son Max).

Minkowski studied in Königsberg and taught in Bonn (1887–1894), Königsberg (1894–1896) and Zürich (1896–1902), and finally in Göttingen from 1902 until his death in 1909. He married Auguste Adler in 1897 with whom he had two daughters; the electrical engineer and inventor Reinhold Rudenberg was his son-in-law.

Minkowski died of appendicitis in Göttingen on 12 January 1909. Max Born delivered the obituary on behalf of the mathematics students at Göttingen. David Hilbert's obituary of Minkowski illustrates the deep friendship between the two mathematicians:

Since my student years, Minkowski was my best, most dependable friend who supported me with all the depth and loyalty that was so characteristic of him. Science, which we loved above all else, brought us together; it seemed to us a garden full of flowers. In it, we enjoyed looking for hidden pathways and discovered many a new perspective that appealed to our sense of beauty, and when one of us showed it to the other and we marveled over it together, our joy was complete. He was for me a rare gift from heaven and I must be grateful to have possessed that gift for so long. Now death has suddenly torn him from our midst. However, what death cannot take away is his noble image in our hearts and the knowledge that his spirit continues to be active in us.

— Hilbert, 1909

The main-belt asteroid 12493 Minkowski and M-matrices are named in Minkowski's honor.

== Career ==
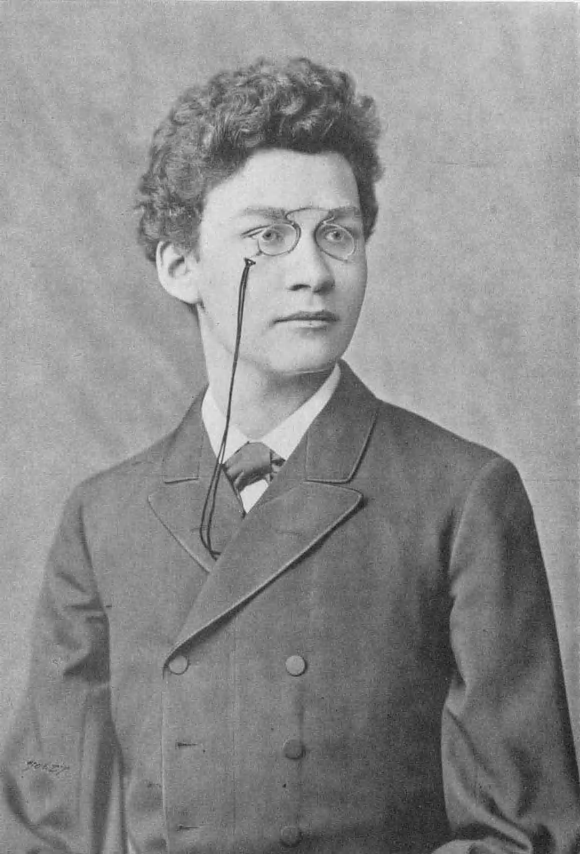
Minkowski in 1883, at the time of being awarded the Mathematics Prize of the French Academy of Sciences

Minkowski was educated in East Prussia at the Albertina University of Königsberg, where he earned his doctorate in 1885 under the direction of Ferdinand von Lindemann. In 1883, while still a student at Königsberg, he was awarded the Mathematics Prize of the French Academy of Sciences for his manuscript on the theory of quadratic forms. Because of his very young age of 18, which was unheard of in the mathematics community and his obscurity as a mathematician at the time, his sharing the award with eminent English mathematician Henry Smith, who was certainly a great deal more famous than Hermann and to whom the prize was awarded posthumously. This caused severe unrest among English mathematicians. The prize committee, despite the numerous complaints, never changed their decision. He also became a friend of another renowned mathematician, David Hilbert. His brother, Oskar Minkowski (1858–1931), was a well-known physician and researcher.

Minkowski taught at the universities of Bonn, Königsberg, Zürich, and Göttingen. At the Eidgenössisches Polytechnikum, today the ETH Zurich, he was one of Einstein's teachers.

Minkowski explored the arithmetic of quadratic forms, especially concerning n variables, and his research into that topic led him to consider certain geometric properties in a space of n dimensions. In 1896, he presented his geometry of numbers, a geometrical method that solved problems in number theory. He is also the creator of the Minkowski Sausage and the Minkowski cover of a curve.

In 1902, he joined the Mathematics Department of Göttingen University and became a close colleague of David Hilbert, whom he first met at university in Königsberg. Constantin Carathéodory was one of his students there.

== Work on relativity ==
By 1908 Minkowski realized that the special theory of relativity, introduced by his former student Albert Einstein in 1905, along with the previous work of Lorentz and Poincaré, could best be understood in a four-dimensional space, since known as the "Minkowski spacetime", in which time and space are not separated entities but intermingled in a four-dimensional space–time, and in which the Lorentz geometry of special relativity can be effectively represented using the invariant interval $x^2 + y^2 + z^2 - c^2 t^2$ (see History of special relativity).

The mathematical basis of Minkowski space can also be found in the hyperboloid model of hyperbolic space already known in the 19th century, because isometries (or motions) in hyperbolic space can be related to Lorentz transformations, which included contributions of Wilhelm Killing (1880, 1885), Henri Poincaré (1881), Homersham Cox (1881), Alexander Macfarlane (1894) and others (see History of Lorentz transformations).

The beginning part of his address called "Space and Time" delivered at the 80th Assembly of German Natural Scientists and Physicians (21 September 1908) is now famous:

The views of space and time which I wish to lay before you have sprung from the soil of experimental physics, and therein lies their strength. They are radical. Henceforth space by itself, and time by itself, are doomed to fade away into mere shadows, and only a kind of union of the two will preserve an independent reality.

== Publications ==
=== Relativity ===
- Minkowski, Hermann (1915) [1907]. "Das Relativitätsprinzip". Annalen der Physik. 352 (15): 927–938. Bibcode:1915AnP...352..927M. doi:10.1002/andp.19153521505.
- Minkowski, Hermann (1908). "Die Grundgleichungen für die elektromagnetischen Vorgänge in bewegten Körpern" . Nachrichten der Gesellschaft der Wissenschaften zu Göttingen, Mathematisch-Physikalische Klasse: 53–111.
  - English translation: "The Fundamental Equations for Electromagnetic Processes in Moving Bodies". In: The Principle of Relativity (1920), Calcutta: University Press, 1–69.
- Minkowski, Hermann (1909). "Raum und Zeit" . Jahresbericht der Deutschen Mathematiker-Vereinigung. 18: 75–88. Bibcode:1909JDMaV..18...75M.
  - Various English translations on Wikisource: "Space and Time".
- Blumenthal O. (ed): Das Relativitätsprinzip, Leipzig 1913, 1923 (Teubner), Engl tr (W. Perrett & G. B. Jeffrey) The Principle of Relativity London 1923 (Methuen); reprinted New York 1952 (Dover) entitled H. A. Lorentz, Albert Einstein, Hermann Minkowski, and Hermann Weyl, The Principle of Relativity: A Collection of Original Memoirs.
- Space and Time – Minkowski's Papers on Relativity, Minkowski Institute Press, 2012 ISBN 978-0-9879871-3-6 (free ebook).

=== Diophantine approximations ===
- Minkowski, Hermann (1907). Diophantische Approximationen: Eine Einführung in die Zahlentheorie. Leipzig-Berlin: R. G. Teubner.

=== Mathematical (posthumous) ===
- Minkowski, Hermann (1910). Geometrie der Zahlen. Leipzig-Berlin: B. G. Teubner Verlag. MR 0249269.
- Minkowski, Hermann (1911). Gesammelte Abhandlungen 2 vols. Leipzig-Berlin: R. G. Teubner. Reprinted in one volume New York, Chelsea 1967.

== See also ==
- List of things named after Hermann Minkowski
- Abraham–Minkowski controversy
- Brunn–Minkowski theorem
- Hasse–Minkowski theorem
- Hermite–Minkowski theorem
- Minkowski addition
- Minkowski (crater)
- Minkowski distance
- Minkowski functional
- Minkowski inequality
- Minkowski model
- Minkowski plane
- Minkowski problem
- Minkowski problem for polytopes
- Minkowski's second theorem
- Minkowski space
- Minkowski's bound
- Minkowski's theorem in geometry of numbers
- Minkowski–Hlawka theorem
- Minkowski–Steiner formula
- Smith–Minkowski–Siegel mass formula
- Proper time
- Separating axis theorem
- Taxicab geometry
- World line
