= Minkowski–Hlawka theorem =

Existence theorem on the lattice packing of hyperspheres

In mathematics, the Minkowski–Hlawka theorem is a result on the lattice packing of hyperspheres in dimension n > 1. It states that there is a lattice in Euclidean space of dimension n, such that the corresponding best packing of hyperspheres with centres at the lattice points has density Δ satisfying

$$\Delta \geq \frac{\zeta(n)}{2^{n-1}},$$

with ζ the Riemann zeta function. Here as n → ∞, ζ(n) → 1. The proof of this theorem is indirect and does not give an explicit example, however, and there is still no known simple and explicit way to construct lattices with packing densities exceeding this bound for arbitrary n. In principle one can find explicit examples: for example, even just picking a few "random" lattices will work with high probability. The problem is that testing these lattices to see if they are solutions requires finding their shortest vectors, and the number of cases to check grows very fast with the dimension, so this could take a very long time.

This result was stated without proof by Hermann Minkowski (1911, pages 265–276) and proved by Edmund Hlawka (1943). The result is related to a linear lower bound for the Hermite constant.

== Siegel's theorem ==
Siegel (1945) proved the following generalization of the Minkowski–Hlawka theorem. If S is a bounded set in R^{n} with Jordan volume vol(S) then the average number of nonzero lattice vectors in S is vol(S)/D, where the average is taken over all lattices with a fundamental domain of volume D, and similarly the average number of primitive lattice vectors in S is vol(S)/Dζ(n).

The Minkowski–Hlawka theorem follows easily from this, using the fact that if S is a star-shaped centrally symmetric body (such as a ball) containing less than 2 primitive lattice vectors then it contains no nonzero lattice vectors.

== See also ==
- Kepler conjecture
