= Minkowski sausage =

Fractal first proposed by Hermann Minkowski

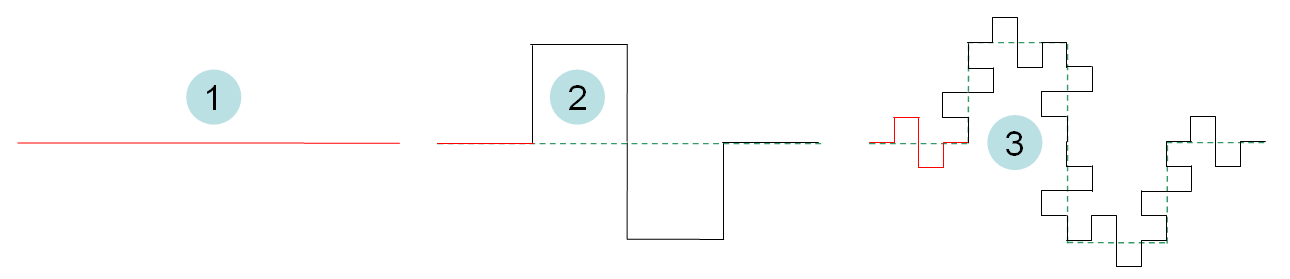
First iterations of the quadratic type 2 Koch curve, the Minkowski sausage (Note: Quadratic Koch curve type 2)

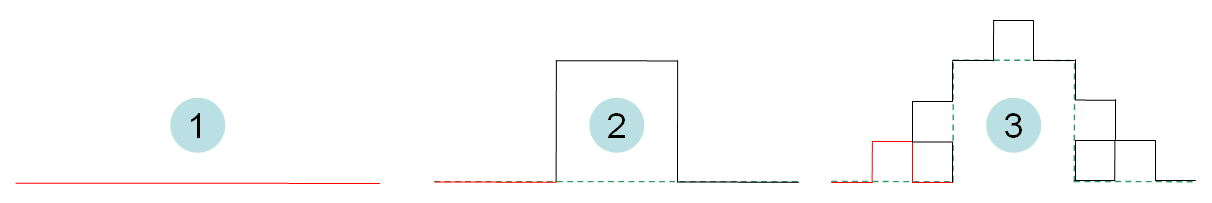
First iterations of the quadratic type 1 Koch curve (Note: Quadratic Koch curve type 1)

Alternative generator with dimension of (ln 18)/(ln 6) ≈ 1.61 (Note: Neither type 1 nor 2)

Higher iteration of type 2

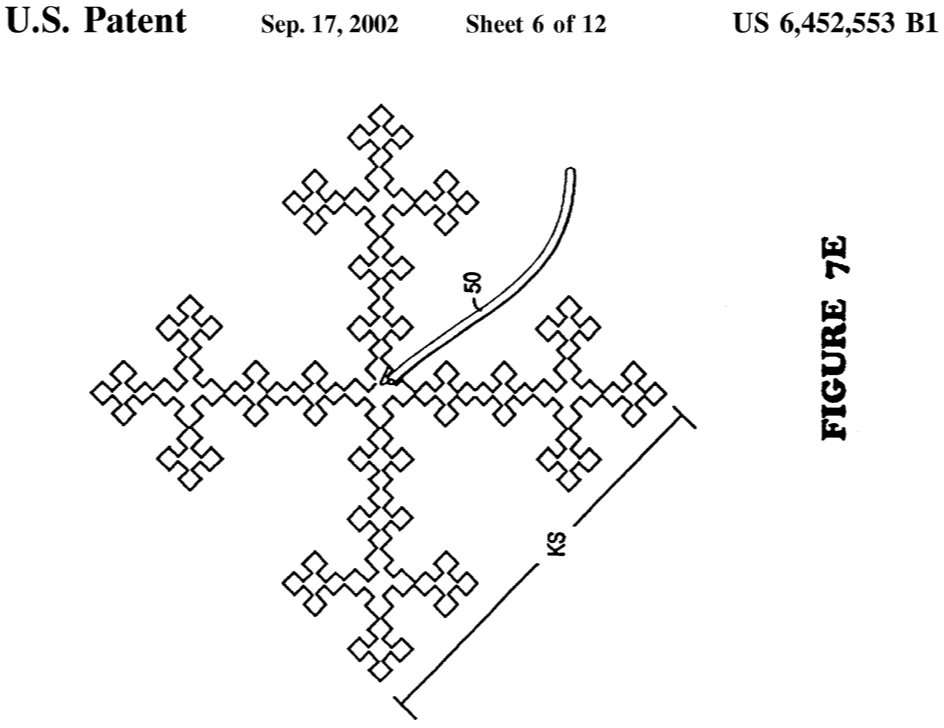
Example of a fractal antenna: a space-filling curve called a "Minkowski Island" or "Minkowski fractal"

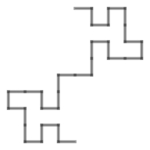
Generator

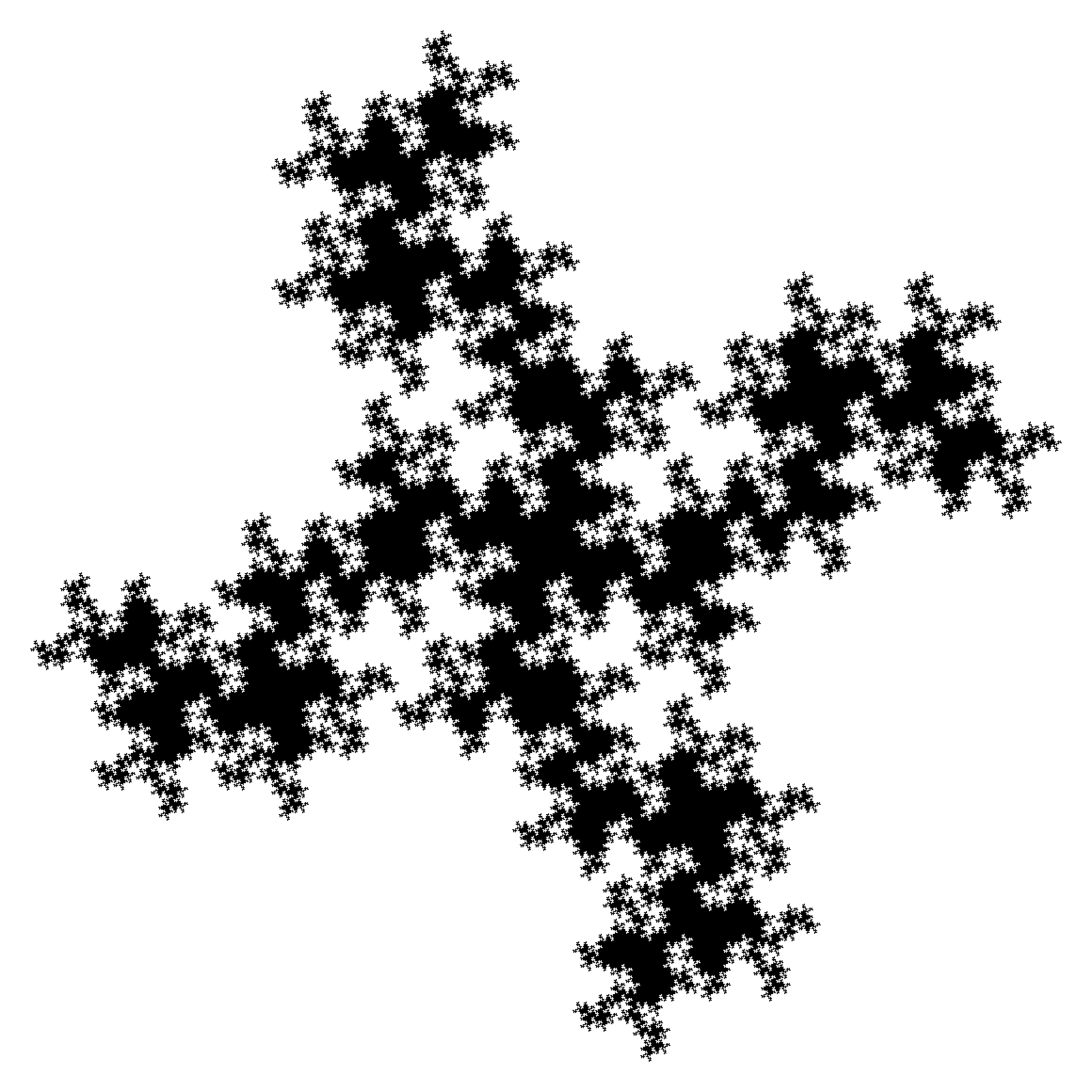
island

The Minkowski sausage or Minkowski curve is a fractal first proposed by and named for Hermann Minkowski as well as its casual resemblance to a sausage or sausage links. The initiator is a line segment and the generator is a broken line of eight parts one fourth the length.

The Sausage has a Hausdorff dimension of $\left ( \ln8/\ln4\ \right ) = 1.5 = 3/2$. It is therefore often chosen when studying the physical properties of non-integer fractal objects. It is strictly self-similar. It never intersects itself. It is continuous everywhere, but differentiable nowhere. It is not rectifiable. It has a Lebesgue measure of 0. The type 1 curve has a dimension of (ln 5)/(ln 3) ≈ 1.46.

Multiple Minkowski Sausages may be arranged in a four sided polygon or square to create a quadratic Koch island or Minkowski island/[snow]flake:

Islands

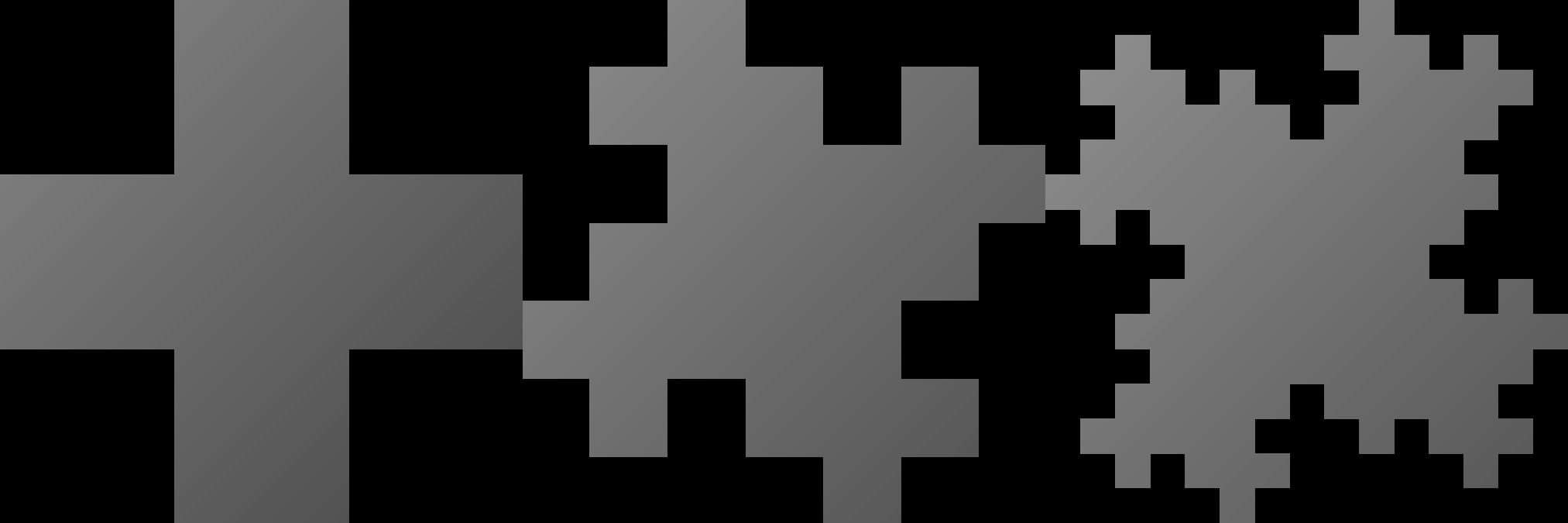
Island formed by a different generator with a dimension of ≈1.36521 or 3/2

Island formed by using the Sausage as the generator (Note: This has been called the "zig-zag quadratic Koch snowflake".)

Anti-island (anticross-stitch curve), iterations 0-4

Anti-island: the generator's symmetry results in the island mirrored

Same island as the first formed from a different generator , which forms 2 right triangles with side lengths in ratio: 1:2:√5

Quadratic island formed using curves with a different generator

== See also ==
- Self-avoiding walk
- Vicsek fractal
