= Abraham–Minkowski controversy =

In physics: electromagnetic momentum within dielectric media

The Abraham–Minkowski controversy is a physics debate concerning electromagnetic momentum within dielectric media. Two equations were first suggested by Hermann Minkowski (1908) and Max Abraham (1909) for this momentum. They predict different values, from which the name of the controversy derives. Experimental support has been claimed for both.

The issue is considered theoretically resolved in literature. The division of the electromagnetic tensor between an "electromagnetic" part and a "matter" part is arbitrary and cannot be physically distinguished.The two points of view can be considered to be different physical interpretations and thus neither need be more correct than the other.

== Equations ==
In SI units, the equations describe electromagnetic momentum and are given by

Minkowski	Abraham
$\textbf{P} = \textbf{D} \times \textbf{B}$	$\textbf{P} = \frac{\textbf{E} \times \textbf{H}}{c^2}$

where:

- $\textbf{P}$ is the density of electromagnetic momentum
- $\textbf{D}$ is the electric displacement field
- $\textbf{B}$ is the magnetic flux density
- $\textbf{E}$ is the electric field
- $\textbf{H}$ is the magnetizing field
- $c^2$ is the speed of light squared

=== Consequences ===
According to Abraham, the momentum of an electromagnetic wave in a medium should be lower in materials where light travels slower; Minkowski predicts that the momentum should be larger.

A finite-length optical fiber emitting light at one of its ends bends outwards as if to recoil from the light emitted from the end. This is compatible with the prediction by Abraham's model. Other, more complicated experiments are compatible with Minkowski's model.
