= Minkowski's second theorem =

Theorem in geometric number theory

In mathematics, Minkowski's second theorem is a result in the geometry of numbers about the values taken by a norm on a lattice and the volume of its fundamental cell. It is named so because it is a strengthening of Minkowski's theorem.

== Setting ==
Let K be a closed convex centrally symmetric body of positive finite volume in n-dimensional Euclidean space $\mathbb{R}^n$. The gauge or distance Minkowski functional g attached to K is defined by
$$g(x) = \inf \left\{\lambda \in \mathbb{R} : x \in \lambda K \right\} .$$

Conversely, given a norm g on $\mathbb{R}^n$ we define K to be
$$K = \left\{ x \in \R^n : g(x) \le 1 \right\} .$$

Let Γ be a lattice in $\mathbb{R}^n$. The successive minima of K or g on Γ are defined by setting the k-th successive minimum λ_{k} to be the infimum of the numbers λ such that λK contains k linearly-independent vectors of Γ. We have 0 < λ_{1} ≤ λ_{2} ≤ ... ≤ λ_{n} < ∞.

== Statement ==
The successive minima satisfy
$$\frac{2^n}{n!} \operatorname{vol}\left(\mathbb{R}^n/\Gamma\right) \le \lambda_1\lambda_2\cdots\lambda_n \operatorname{vol}(K)\le 2^n \operatorname{vol}\left(\mathbb{R}^n/\Gamma\right).$$

== Proof ==
A basis of linearly independent lattice vectors b_{1}, b_{2}, ..., b_{n} can be defined by g(b_{j}) = λ_{j} (warning : it may be not a basis of the lattice, but only a basis of the ambient space).

The lower bound is proved by considering the convex polytope 2n with vertices at ±b_{j}/ λ_{j}, which has an interior enclosed by K and a volume which is 2^{n} / (n! λ_{1}λ_{2}...λ_{n}) times an integer multiple of a primitive cell of the lattice (as seen by scaling the polytope by λ_{j} along each basis vector to obtain 2^{n} n-simplices with lattice point vectors), the integer being the index of the $\mathbb{Z}$-span of the family $(b_i)_i$ as a subgroup of the lattice.

To prove the upper bound, consider functions f_{j}(x) sending points x in $K$ to the centroid of the subset of points in $K$ that can be written as $x + \sum_{i=1}^{j-1} a_i b_i$ for some real numbers $a_i$. Then the coordinate transform
$$x' = h(x) = \sum_{i=1}^{n} (\lambda_i -\lambda_{i-1}) f_i(x)/2$$
has a Jacobian determinant $J = \lambda_1 \lambda_2 \ldots \lambda_n/2^n$. If $p$ and $q$ are in the interior of $K$ and $p-q = \sum_{i=1}^k a_i b_i$(with $a_k \neq 0$) then
$$(h(p) - h(q)) = \sum_{i=0}^k c_i b_i \in \lambda_k K$$
with $c_k = \lambda_k a_k /2$, where the inclusion in $\lambda_k K$ (specifically the interior of $\lambda_k K$) is due to convexity and symmetry. But lattice points in the interior of $\lambda_k K$ are, by definition of $\lambda_k$, always expressible as a linear combination of $b_1, b_2, \ldots b_{k-1}$, so any two distinct points of $K' = h(K) = \{ x' \mid h(x) = x' \}$ cannot be separated by a lattice vector.

The entire space $\mathbb{R}^n$ is tiled by translated copies of a primitive cell $\mathbb{R}^n = \bigcup_{v \in \Gamma} \bigl((\mathbb{R}^n / \Gamma) + v\bigr)$. The intersections $K'_v := K' \cap \bigl((\mathbb{R}^n / \Gamma) + v\bigr)$ with $K'$ have a total volume in sum that is less than the volume of a single primite cell $\mathbb{R}^n / \Gamma$ and therefore
$$\operatorname{vol} (K) \cdot J = \operatorname{vol}(K') \le \operatorname{vol}(\R^n/\Gamma).$$
To see this, consider two intersections $K'_u$ and $K'_v$ with $u, v \in \Gamma$ and their translated versions $K'_u - u$ and $K'_v - v$ that are both contained in the primitive cell located at the origin. If they would intersect at some point $y \in (\mathbb{R}^n / \Gamma)$, then the two original points $y + u \in K'_u \subseteq K'$ and $y + v \in K'_v \subseteq K'$ would be separated by a lattice vector, which can be seen by considering the difference $(y + u) - (y + v) = u - v \in \Gamma$. This cannot be the case and therefore, translating every of the intersections into the primitive cell located at the origin does not lead to any intersections, which shows the claim.
