= Geometry of numbers =

Application of geometry in number theory

Geometry of numbers, also known as geometric number theory, is the part of number theory which uses geometry for the study of algebraic numbers. Typically, a ring of algebraic integers is viewed as a lattice in $\mathbb R^n,$ and the study of these lattices provides fundamental information on algebraic numbers. Hermann Minkowski (1896) initiated this line of research at the age of 26 in his work The Geometry of Numbers.

Best rational approximants for irrational numbers $\pi$ (green circle), $e$ (blue diamond), $\phi$ (pink oblong), $\sqrt 3/2$ (grey hexagon), $1/\sqrt2$ (red octagon) and $1/\sqrt3$ (orange triangle) calculated from their continued fraction expansions, plotted as slopes $y/x$ with errors from their true values (black dashes)

The geometry of numbers has a close relationship with other fields of mathematics, especially functional analysis and Diophantine approximation, the problem of finding rational numbers that approximate an irrational quantity.

== Minkowski's results ==
Suppose that $\Gamma$ is a lattice in $n$-dimensional Euclidean space $\mathbb{R}^n$ and $K$ is a convex centrally symmetric body. Minkowski's theorem, sometimes called Minkowski's first theorem, states that if $\operatorname{vol} (K)>2^n \operatorname{vol}(\mathbb{R}^n/\Gamma)$, then $K$ contains a nonzero vector in $\Gamma$.

The successive minimum $\lambda_k$ is defined to be the infimum of the numbers $\lambda$ such that $\lambda K$ contains $k$ linearly independent vectors of $\Gamma$. Minkowski's theorem on successive minima, sometimes called Minkowski's second theorem, is a strengthening of his first theorem and states that

$$\lambda_1\lambda_2\cdots\lambda_n \operatorname{vol} (K)\le 2^n \operatorname{vol} (\mathbb{R}^n/\Gamma).$$

== Algebraic number theory ==
Minkowski applied his results to the area of algebraic number theory, and this was one motivation for the term geometry of numbers. The ring of integers in a number field can be embedded as a lattice in a higher dimensional space. The Gaussian integers, which are all $a+ib$ with $a,b$ integers, already is a lattice in the complex plane. Other rings of integers are not obviously lattices, like $\mathbb Z[\sqrt 2]$, which is contained in the real line, but is dense.

Minkowski's basic idea was to embed numbers in a higher dimensional space, and this gives one explanation of why the general theory has been termed "the geometry of numbers". Every ring of integers can be embedded into a higher-dimensional Euclidean space in which it becomes a lattice. More generally, every fractional ideal embeds as a lattice. Estimates on the sizes of lattice vectors and volumes then lead to norm-bounds on the size of representative ideals within each ideal class. In particular, the geometry of numbers gave the first proof that the ideal class group is finite, because the number of elements in a lattice of bounded norm is finite, which was a major unsolved problem prior to Minkowski's work. Related geometric arguments supply an alternative proof of the Dirichlet unit theorem.

Minkowski's construction embeds a number field $K$ simultaneously into all of its real and complex completions, that is, embeddings $\sigma$ of $K$ into $\mathbb C$. These may be real, if $\sigma(K)\subset\mathbb R$, or complex otherwise. If $K$ has $r_1$ real embeddings and $r_2$ pairs of complex embeddings, then the Minkowski embedding realizes

$$K\otimes_{\mathbb Q}\mathbb R \cong \mathbb R^{r_1}\times \mathbb C^{r_2}$$

Elementary arguments show that the ring of integers is a torsion-free abelian group of rank $n$, where $n=r_1+2r_2$ is the degree of the number field. Therefore it embeds as a lattice under the Minkowski embedding. For the example of $\mathbb Z[\sqrt 2]$ there are two real embeddings, namely $\sqrt 2\to \sqrt 2$ and $\sqrt 2\to -\sqrt 2$, and the point $a+b\sqrt 2$ embeds as the point $(a+b\sqrt 2,a-b\sqrt 2)$, and the image is therefore the lattice generated by $(1,1)$ and $(\sqrt 2,-\sqrt 2)$ in $\mathbb R^2$.

Minkowski's theorem then shows that every ideal class of $K$ contains an integral ideal whose norm is bounded explicitly in terms of the discriminant of $K$.

Indeed, the discriminant enters through the covolume of this lattice. The discriminant $\Delta_K$ is the determinant of the Gram matrix of an integral basis of $\mathcal O_K$ with respect to the trace form $(\operatorname{Tr}_{K/\mathbb Q}$. Under the Minkowski embedding, this determinant is the square of the volume of a fundamental parallelepiped, up to a factor coming from complex embeddings:
$$\operatorname{covol}(\mathcal O_K)=2^{-r_2}\sqrt{|\Delta_K|}.$$
More generally, for a fractional ideal $\mathfrak a$,

$$\operatorname{covol}(\mathfrak a)=2^{-r_2}N(\mathfrak a)\sqrt{|\Delta_K|}.$$

Thus the discriminant measures the volume of the fundamental cell of the arithmetic lattice obtained from the ring of integers. Applying Minkowski's convex body theorem to this lattice gives a nonzero element $\alpha\in\mathfrak a$ satisfying
$$|N_{K/\mathbb Q}(\alpha)|\leq
\left(\frac{4}{\pi}\right)^{r_2}\frac{n!}{n^n}\sqrt{|\Delta_K|}\,N(\mathfrak a),$$
which is the estimate underlying the Minkowski bound for ideal classes.

== Quadratic forms ==
Another application of Minkowski theory is to quadratic forms. A positive-definite quadratic form in n variables defines an ellipsoid in $\mathbb R^n$. Asking for small values of a quadratic form on integers is equivalent to asking whether scalings of this ellipsoid contain non-zero integer lattice points. Minkowski's convex body theorem then gives bounds for the minimum of the quadratic form on integers, in terms of its determinant.

== Diophantine approximation ==
The geometry of numbers also gives geometric proofs of results in Diophantine approximation. The problem of approximating real numbers by rationals, for example, can be formulated as a problem of finding nonzero integer points in a suitable convex body. Inequalities involving several linear forms in integer variables can be interpreted as conditions defining a symmetric convex region in Euclidean space. Minkowski's theorem then gives the existence of integer solutions satisfying prescribed bounds.

This method underlies classical results on simultaneous approximation and on small values of systems of linear forms, such as Dirichlet's approximation theorem.

== Later research in the geometry of numbers ==
In 1930–1960 research on the geometry of numbers was conducted by many number theorists (including Louis Mordell, Harold Davenport and Carl Ludwig Siegel). In recent years, Lenstra, Brion, and Barvinok have developed combinatorial theories that enumerate the lattice points in some convex bodies.

=== Subspace theorem of W. M. Schmidt ===
In the geometry of numbers, the subspace theorem was obtained by Wolfgang M. Schmidt in 1972. It states that if n is a positive integer, and L_{1},...,L_{n} are linearly independent linear forms in n variables with algebraic coefficients and if ε>0 is any given real number, then the non-zero integer points x in n coordinates with

$$|L_1(x)\cdots L_n(x)|<|x|^{-\varepsilon}$$

lie in a finite number of proper subspaces of Q^{n}.

== Significance in other areas ==
Because convex bodies are ubiquitous in many areas of mathematics, Minkowski's geometry of numbers led to developments in other areas that are not directly related to number theory and lattice theory.

=== Convex geometry ===
The geometry of numbers contributed to the development of convex geometry. A central operation on convex bodies is the Minkowski sum $A+B=\{a+b:a\in A,\ b\in B\}$. The Brunn–Minkowski inequality relates the volume of this sum to the volumes of the summands, asserting in one form that

$$\operatorname{vol}(A+B)^{1/n}\geq
\operatorname{vol}(A)^{1/n}+\operatorname{vol}(B)^{1/n}.$$

Such results belong to the convex-geometric side of Minkowski's work: they concern the behavior of bodies, volume, and linear structure in Euclidean space. In the geometry of numbers, these ideas have been applied to the study of sumsets, one of the key objects of additive combinatorics.

=== Functional analysis ===
Minkowski's geometry of numbers had a profound influence on functional analysis. Minkowski proved that symmetric convex bodies induce norms in finite-dimensional vector spaces. Minkowski's theorem was generalized to topological vector spaces by Kolmogorov, whose theorem states that the symmetric convex sets that are closed and bounded generate the topology of a Banach space.

Researchers continue to study generalizations to star-shaped sets and other non-convex sets.

== Bibliography ==
- Beck, Matthias; Robins, Sinai (2007). Computing the continuous discretely: Integer-point enumeration in polyhedra. Undergraduate Texts in Mathematics. Springer.
- Enrico Bombieri; Vaaler, J. (Feb 1983). "On Siegel's lemma". Inventiones Mathematicae. 73 (1): 11–32. Bibcode:1983InMat..73...11B. doi:10.1007/BF01393823. S2CID 121274024.
- Enrico Bombieri & Walter Gubler (2006). Heights in Diophantine Geometry. Cambridge U. P.
- Cassels, J. W. S. (1997). An Introduction to the Geometry of Numbers. Springer Classics in Mathematics. Springer-Verlag. Reprint of 1959 and 1971 Springer-Verlag editions.
- Conway, John Horton; Sloane, N. J. A. (1998). Sphere Packings, Lattices and Groups (3rd ed.). New York: Springer-Verlag.
- Gardner, R. J. (1995). Geometric tomography. New York: Cambridge University Press. 2nd edition, 2006.
- M. Grötschel, Lovász, L., A. Schrijver: Geometric Algorithms and Combinatorial Optimization, Springer, 1988
- P. M. Gruber, Convex and discrete geometry, Springer-Verlag, New York, 2007.
- P. M. Gruber, J. M. Wills (editors), Handbook of convex geometry. Vol. A. B, North-Holland, Amsterdam, 1993.
- Hancock, Harris (1939). Development of the Minkowski Geometry of Numbers. Macmillan. (Republished in 1964 by Dover.)
- Edmund Hlawka, Johannes Schoißengeier, Rudolf Taschner. Geometric and Analytic Number Theory. Universitext. Springer-Verlag, 1991.
- Kalton, Nigel J.; Peck, N. Tenney; Roberts, James W. (1984). An F-space sampler. London Mathematical Society Lecture Note Series, 89. Cambridge: Cambridge University Press. pp. xii+240. ISBN 0-521-27585-7. MR 0808777.
- C. G. Lekkerkererker. Geometry of Numbers. Wolters-Noordhoff, North Holland, Wiley. 1969.
- Lenstra, A. K.; Lenstra, H. W. Jr.; Lovász, L. (1982). "Factoring polynomials with rational coefficients" (PDF). Mathematische Annalen. 261 (4): 515–534. doi:10.1007/BF01457454. hdl:1887/3810. MR 0682664. S2CID 5701340.
- Lovász, L.: An Algorithmic Theory of Numbers, Graphs, and Convexity, CBMS-NSF Regional Conference Series in Applied Mathematics 50, SIAM, Philadelphia, Pennsylvania, 1986
- Malyshev, A.V. (2001) [1994]. "Geometry of numbers". Encyclopedia of Mathematics. EMS Press.
- Minkowski, Hermann (1910). Geometrie der Zahlen. Leipzig and Berlin: R. G. Teubner. JFM 41.0239.03. MR 0249269.
- Neukirch, Jürgen (1999). Algebraic Number Theory. Grundlehren der mathematischen Wissenschaften. Vol. 322. Springer-Verlag. ISBN 978-3-540-65399-8. MR 1697859. Zbl 0956.11021.
- Wolfgang M. Schmidt. Diophantine approximation. Lecture Notes in Mathematics 785. Springer. (1980 [1996 with minor corrections])
- Schmidt, Wolfgang M. (1996). Diophantine approximations and Diophantine equations. Lecture Notes in Mathematics. Vol. 1467 (2nd ed.). Springer-Verlag. ISBN 3-540-54058-X. Zbl 0754.11020.
- Rolf Schneider, Convex bodies: the Brunn-Minkowski theory, Cambridge University Press, Cambridge, 1993.
- Siegel, Carl Ludwig (1989). Lectures on the Geometry of Numbers. Springer-Verlag.
- Anthony C. Thompson, Minkowski geometry, Cambridge University Press, Cambridge, 1996.
- Hermann Weyl. Theory of reduction for arithmetical equivalence . Trans. Amer. Math. Soc. 48 (1940) 126–164. doi:10.1090/S0002-9947-1940-0002345-2
- Hermann Weyl. Theory of reduction for arithmetical equivalence. II . Trans. Amer. Math. Soc. 51 (1942) 203–231. doi:10.2307/1989946
