= Yurii Nesterov =

Russian mathematician (born 1956)

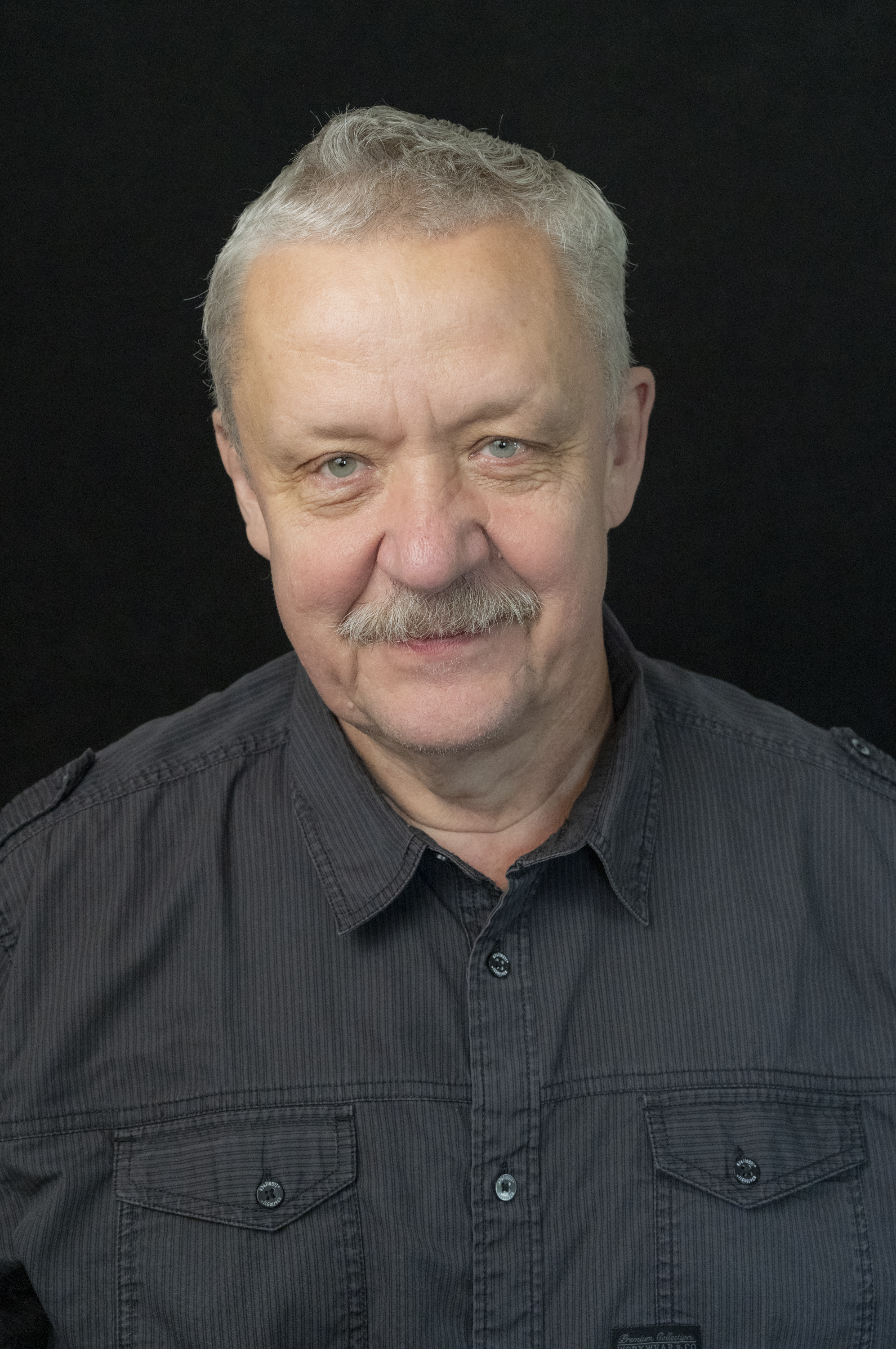
- Nesterov in 2026
- Born: January 25, 1956 (age 70); Moscow, USSR
- Citizenship: Belgium
- Education: Moscow State University (1977)
- Known for: Nesterov acceleration
- Awards: Dantzig Prize, 2000; John von Neumann Theory Prize, 2009; EURO Gold Medal, 2016; Carl Friedrich Gauss Prize, 2026
- Scientific career
- Fields: Convex optimization, Semidefinite programming, Nonlinear programming, Numerical analysis, Applied mathematics
- Workplaces: Central Economic Mathematical Institute; UCLouvain; CUHKSZ; Corvinus University of Budapest
- Doctoral advisor: Boris Polyak

Yurii Evgenievich Nesterov (Russian: Юрий Евгеньевич Нестеров) (born January 25, 1956) is a Russian mathematician, an internationally recognized expert in convex optimization, especially in the development of efficient algorithms and numerical optimization analysis. He is currently an emeritus professor at the University of Louvain (UCLouvain) and Corvinus University of Budapest, fractional professor at the Chinese University of Hong Kong, Shenzhen (CUHKSZ) and Shenzhen Loop Area Institute.

== Biography ==
In 1977, Yurii Nesterov graduated in applied mathematics at Moscow State University. From 1977 to 1992 he was a researcher at the Central Economic Mathematical Institute of the Russian Academy of Sciences. Since 1993, he has been working at UCLouvain, specifically in the Department of Mathematical Engineering from the Louvain School of Engineering, Center for Operations Research and Econometrics.

In 2024, Nesterov joined School of Data Science of the Chinese University of Hong Kong, Shenzhen and Shenzhen Loop Area Institute as fractional professor.

== Academic work ==
Nesterov is most famous for his work in convex optimization, including his 2004 book, considered a canonical reference on the subject. His main novel contribution is an accelerated version of gradient descent that converges considerably faster than ordinary gradient descent (commonly referred as Nesterov momentum, Nesterov Acceleration or Nesterov accelerated gradient, in short – NAG). This method, sometimes called "FISTA", was further developed by Beck & Teboulle in their 2009 paper "A Fast Iterative Shrinkage-Thresholding Algorithm for Linear Inverse Problems".

His work with Arkadi Nemirovski in their 1994 book is the first to point out that the interior point method can solve convex optimization problems, and the first to make a systematic study of semidefinite programming (SDP). Also in this book, they introduced the self-concordant functions which are useful in the analysis of Newton's method.

== Awards and honors ==
In 2000, Nesterov received the Dantzig Prize.

In 2009, Nesterov won the John von Neumann Theory Prize.

In 2016, Nesterov received the EURO Gold Medal.

In 2023, Yurii Nesterov and Arkadi Nemirovski received the WLA Prize in Computer Science or Mathematics, "for their seminal work in convex optimization theory".

In 2026, Nesterov was awarded the Carl Friedrich Gauss Prize by the IMU at the ICM 2026.
