= Renegar =

Renegar may refer to:

- Brian Renegar (born 1950), American politician
- James Renegar (born 1955), American mathematician
- Renegar Glacier, in Antarctica
