= Arkadi Nemirovski =

Russian and Israelian mathematician

- Аркадий Немировский
- Born: March 14, 1947 (age 79); Moscow, Russia
- Education: Moscow State University (M.Sc 1970 & Ph.D 1973); Kiev Institute of Cybernetics
- Known for: Ellipsoid method Robust optimization Interior point method
- Awards: Fulkerson Prize (1982); Dantzig Prize (1991); John von Neumann Theory Prize (2003); Norbert Wiener Prize (2019) The WLA Prize in Computer Science or Mathematics (2023)
- Scientific career
- Workplaces: Georgia Institute of Technology; Technion – Israel Institute of Technology

Arkadi Semenovich Nemirovski (Russian: Аркадий Немировский; born March 14, 1947) is a professor at the H. Milton Stewart School of Industrial and Systems Engineering at the Georgia Institute of Technology. He has been a leader in continuous optimization and is best known for his work on the ellipsoid method, modern interior-point methods and robust optimization.

== Biography ==
Nemirovski earned a Ph.D. in Mathematics in 1974 from Moscow State University and a Doctor of Sciences in Mathematics degree in 1990 from the Institute of Cybernetics of the Ukrainian Academy of Sciences in Kiev. He has won three prestigious prizes: the Fulkerson Prize, the George B. Dantzig Prize, and the John von Neumann Theory Prize. He was elected a member of the U.S. National Academy of Engineering (NAE) in 2017 "for the development of efficient algorithms for large-scale convex optimization problems", and the U.S National Academy of Sciences (NAS) in 2020. In 2023, Nemirovski and Yurii Nesterov were jointly awarded the 2023 WLA Prize in Computer Science or Mathematics "for their seminal work in convex optimization theory, including the theory of self-concordant functions and interior-point methods, a complexity theory of optimization, accelerated gradient methods, and methodological advances in robust optimization."

== Academic work ==
Nemirovski first proposed mirror descent along with David Yudin in 1983.

His work with Yurii Nesterov in their 1994 book is the first to point out that the interior point method can solve convex optimization problems, and the first to make a systematic study of semidefinite programming (SDP). Also in this book, they introduced the self-concordant functions which are useful in the analysis of Newton's method.

== Books ==
- co-authored with Yurii Nesterov: Interior-Point Polynomial Algorithms in Convex Programming. Society for Industrial and Applied Mathematics. 1994. ISBN 978-0898715156.
- co-authored with Aharon Ben-Tal: Lectures on Modern Convex Optimization. Society for Industrial and Applied Mathematics. 2001. ISBN 978-0-89871-491-3.
- co-authored with A. Ben-Tal and L. El Ghaoui: Robust Optimization. Princeton University Press. 2009. ISBN 978-0-691-14368-2.
