= James Renegar =

American mathematician

James Milton Renegar Jr. (born May 14, 1955) is an American mathematician, specializing in optimization algorithms for linear programming and nonlinear programming.

== Biography ==
In 1983 he received his Ph.D. in mathematics from the University of California, Berkeley. His Ph.D. thesis On the Computational Complexity of Simplicial Algorithms in Approximation Zeros of Complex Polynomials was supervised by Stephen Smale. After postdoc positions, Renegar joined in 1987 the faculty of the School of Operations Research and Information Engineering at Cornell University and is now a full professor there.

Renegar is a leading expert on optimization algorithms. In recent years, the focus of his research is devising new algorithms for linear programming. His 2001 monograph A Mathematical View of Interior-point Methods in Convex Optimization is intended to present a general theory of interior-point methods, suitable for a wide audience of graduate students in mathematics and engineering.

In 1990 Renegar was an invited speaker at the International Congress of Mathematicians in Kyoto. In 1995 he was a founding member of the nonprofit organization Foundations of Computational Mathematics. He was awarded the 2018 Khachiyan Prize.

James M. Renegar Jr. married Catharine M. Barnaby and is the father of two children, Alice and Nicholas James. James M. Renegar Sr. (1928–2005) practiced law in Oklahoma City for many years.

== Selected publications ==
=== Articles ===
- Renegar, James (1987). "On the worst-case arithmetic complexity of approximating zeros of polynomials". Journal of Complexity. 3 (2): 90–113. doi:10.1016/0885-064X(87)90022-7.
- Renegar, J. (1987). "On the Efficiency of Newton's Method in Approximating All Zeros of a System of Complex Polynomials". Mathematics of Operations Research. 12: 121–148. doi:10.1287/moor.12.1.121.
- Renegar, James (1988). "A polynomial-time algorithm, based on Newton's method, for linear programming". Mathematical Programming. 40–40 (1–3): 59–93. doi:10.1007/BF01580724. S2CID 206798056. 1988(over 740 citations)
- Regenar, James (April 1988). "A faster PSPACE algorithm for deciding the existential theory of the reals" (PDF). Technical Report No. 792. School of Operations Research and Industrial Engineering, College of Engineering, Cornell University. Archived from the original (PDF) on August 17, 2017.
- Renegar, James (1989). "On the Worst-Case Arithmetic Complexity of Approximating Zeros of Systems of Polynomials". SIAM Journal on Computing. 18 (2): 350–370. doi:10.1137/0218024. hdl:1813/8631. ISSN 0097-5397.
- Regenar, James (October 1992). "Some perturbation theory for linear programming" (PDF). Technical Report No. 1038. School of Operations Research and Industrial Engineering, College of Engineering, Cornell University. Archived from the original (PDF) on August 17, 2017.
- Renegar, James (1992). "On the Computational Complexity of Approximating Solutions for Real Algebraic Formulae". SIAM Journal on Computing. 21 (6): 1008–1025. doi:10.1137/0221060. hdl:1813/8742.
- Renegar, James (1992). "On the computational complexity and geometry of the first-order theory of the reals. Part I: Introduction. Preliminaries. The geometry of semi-algebraic sets. The decision problem for the existential theory of the reals". Journal of Symbolic Computation. 13 (3): 255–299. doi:10.1016/S0747-7171(10)80003-3. (over 760 citations)
- Renegar, James (1992). "On the computational complexity and geometry of the first-order theory of the reals. Part II: The general decision problem. Preliminaries for quantifier elimination". Journal of Symbolic Computation. 13 (3): 301–327. doi:10.1016/S0747-7171(10)80004-5.
- Renegar, James (1992). "On the computational complexity and geometry of the first-order theory of the reals. Part III: Quantifier elimination". Journal of Symbolic Computation. 13 (3): 329–352. doi:10.1016/S0747-7171(10)80005-7.
- Renegar, James (1994). "Is It Possible to Know a Problem Instance is Ill-Posed?". Journal of Complexity. 10: 1–56. doi:10.1006/jcom.1994.1001.
- Renegar, James (1995). "Linear programming, complexity theory and elementary functional analysis". Mathematical Programming. 70 (1–3): 279–351. doi:10.1007/BF01585941. hdl:1813/8974. S2CID 16169970.
- Renegar, James (1996). "Condition Numbers, the Barrier Method, and the Conjugate-Gradient Method". SIAM Journal on Optimization. 6 (4): 879–912. doi:10.1137/S105262349427532X. hdl:1813/8987.
- Renegar, James (1998). "Recent Progress on the Complexity of the Decision Problem for the Reals". Quantifier Elimination and Cylindrical Algebraic Decomposition. Texts and Monographs in Symbolic Computation. pp. 220–241. doi:10.1007/978-3-7091-9459-1_11. hdl:1813/8842. ISBN 978-3-211-82794-9.
- Peña, J.; Renegar, J. (2000). "Computing approximate solutions for convex conic systems of constraints". Mathematical Programming. 87 (3): 351–383. doi:10.1007/s101070050001. S2CID 28849631.
- Regenar, James (March 2004). "Hyperbolic programs, and their derivative relaxations" (PDF). Technical Report No. 1406. School of Operations Research and Industrial Engineering, College of Engineering, Cornell University.
- Renegar, James (2016). "Efficient Subgradient Methods for General Convex Optimization". SIAM Journal on Optimization. 26 (4): 2649–2676. arXiv:1605.08712. doi:10.1137/15M1027371. S2CID 13526624.
- Renegar, James (2019). "Accelerated first-order methods for hyperbolic programming". Mathematical Programming. 173 (1–2): 1–35. arXiv:1512.07569. doi:10.1007/s10107-017-1203-y. S2CID 16427533.
- Renegar, James; Grimmer, Benjamin (2021). "A Simple Nearly Optimal Restart Scheme for Speeding up First-Order Methods". Foundations of Computational Mathematics. 22: 211–256. arXiv:1803.00151. doi:10.1007/s10208-021-09502-2. S2CID 53356260.

=== Books ===
- "Front Matter". A Mathematical View of Interior-Point Methods in Convex Optimization. Society for Industrial and Applied Mathematics. 2001. pp. i–vii. doi:10.1137/1.9780898718812.fm. ISBN 978-0-89871-502-6.
