= Fenchel–Moreau theorem =

Mathematical theorem in convex analysis

A function that is not lower semi-continuous. By the Fenchel-Moreau theorem, this function is not equal to its biconjugate.

In convex analysis, the Fenchel–Moreau theorem (named after Werner Fenchel and Jean Jacques Moreau) or Fenchel biconjugation theorem (or just biconjugation theorem) is a theorem which gives necessary and sufficient conditions for a function to be equal to its biconjugate. This is in contrast to the general property that for any function $f^{**} \leq f$. This can be seen as a generalization of the bipolar theorem. It is used in duality theory to prove strong duality (via the perturbation function).

== Statement ==
Let $(X,\tau)$ be a Hausdorff locally convex space, for any extended real valued function $f: X \to \mathbb{R} \cup \{\pm \infty\}$ it follows that $f = f^{**}$ if and only if one of the following is true

1. $f$ is a proper, lower semi-continuous, and convex function,
2. $f \equiv +\infty$, or
3. $f \equiv -\infty$.
