= Wolfe duality =

In mathematical optimization, Wolfe duality, named after Philip Wolfe, is type of dual problem in which the objective function and constraints are all differentiable functions. Using this concept a lower bound for a minimization problem can be found because of the weak duality principle.

== Mathematical formulation ==
For a minimization problem with inequality constraints,

$$\begin{align}
&\underset{x}{\operatorname{minimize}}& & f(x) \\
&\operatorname{subject\;to}
& &g_i(x) \leq 0, \quad i = 1,\dots,m
\end{align}$$

the Lagrangian dual problem is

$$\begin{align}
&\underset{u}{\operatorname{maximize}}& & \inf_x \left(f(x) + \sum_{j=1}^m u_j g_j(x)\right) \\
&\operatorname{subject\;to}
& &u_i \geq 0, \quad i = 1,\dots,m
\end{align}$$

where the objective function is the Lagrange dual function. Provided that the functions $f$ and $g_1, \ldots, g_m$ are convex and continuously differentiable, the infimum occurs where the gradient is equal to zero. The problem

$$\begin{align}
&\underset{x, u}{\operatorname{maximize}}& & f(x) + \sum_{j=1}^m u_j g_j(x) \\
&\operatorname{subject\;to}
& & \nabla f(x) + \sum_{j=1}^m u_j \nabla g_j(x) = 0 \\
&&&u_i \geq 0, \quad i = 1,\dots,m
\end{align}$$

is called the Wolfe dual problem. This problem employs the KKT conditions as a constraint. Also, the equality constraint $\nabla f(x) + \sum_{j=1}^m u_j \nabla g_j(x)$ is nonlinear in general, so the Wolfe dual problem may be a nonconvex optimization problem. In any case, weak duality holds.

== See also ==
- Lagrangian duality
- Fenchel duality
