= Conic optimization =

Subfield of convex optimization

Conic optimization is a subfield of convex optimization that studies problems consisting of minimizing a convex function over the intersection of an affine subspace and a convex cone.

The class of conic optimization problems includes some of the most well known classes of convex optimization problems, namely linear and semidefinite programming.

== Definition ==
Given a real vector space X, a convex, real-valued function

$$f:C \to \mathbb R$$

defined on a convex cone $C \subset X$, and an affine subspace $\mathcal{H}$ defined by a set of affine constraints $h_i(x) = 0 \$, a conic optimization problem is to find the point $x$ in $C \cap \mathcal{H}$ for which the number $f(x)$ is smallest.

Examples of $C$ include the positive orthant $\mathbb{R}_+^n = \left\{ x \in \mathbb{R}^n : \, x \geq \mathbf{0}\right\}$, positive semidefinite matrices $\mathbb{S}^n_{+}$, and the second-order cone $\left \{ (x,t) \in \mathbb{R}^{n}\times \mathbb{R} : \lVert x \rVert \leq t \right \}$. Often $f \$ is a linear function, in which case the conic optimization problem reduces to a linear program, a semidefinite program, and a second order cone program, respectively.

== Duality ==
Certain special cases of conic optimization problems have notable closed-form expressions of their dual problems.

=== Conic LP ===
The dual of the conic linear program

minimize $c^T x \$
subject to $Ax = b, x \in C \$

is

maximize $b^T y \$
subject to $A^T y + s= c, s \in C^* \$

where $C^*$ denotes the dual cone of $C \$.

Whilst weak duality holds in conic linear programming, strong duality does not necessarily hold.

=== Semidefinite Program ===
The dual of a semidefinite program in inequality form

minimize $c^T x \$
subject to $x_1 F_1 + \cdots + x_n F_n + G \leq 0$

is given by

maximize $\mathrm{tr}\ (GZ)\$
subject to $\mathrm{tr}\ (F_i Z) +c_i =0,\quad i=1,\dots,n$
$$Z \geq0$$
