= Lower convex envelope =

Mathematics concept

In mathematics, and particularly convex analysis, the lower convex envelope $\breve f$ of a real-valued function $f$ defined on a vector space $V$ is defined pointwise as the supremum of all convex functions that lie under that function, i.e.

$$\breve f (x) = \sup\{ g(x) \mid g \text{ is convex and } g \leq f \text{ over } V \}.$$

The lower convex envelope coincides with the biconjugate $f^{**}$ of $f$, but can differ with the biconjugate when this definition is extended to functions whose domains are not the entire vector space or whose values are extended reals, i.e., allowing $\pm\infty$. In such cases, one has the inequalities
$$f^{**}(x)\le \breve f(x)\le f(x).$$

== See also ==
- Convex hull
- Lower envelope
