= Moreau's theorem =

In mathematics, Moreau's theorem is a result in convex analysis named after French mathematician Jean-Jacques Moreau. It shows that sufficiently well-behaved convex functionals on Hilbert spaces are differentiable and the derivative is well-approximated by the so-called Yosida approximation, which is defined in terms of the resolvent operator.

== Statement of the theorem ==
Let H be a Hilbert space and let φ : H → R ∪ {+∞} be a proper, convex and lower semi-continuous extended real-valued functional on H. Let A stand for ∂φ, the subderivative of φ; for α > 0 let J_{α} denote the resolvent:

$$J_{\alpha} = (\mathrm{id} + \alpha A)^{-1};$$

and let A_{α} denote the Yosida approximation to A:

$$A_{\alpha} = \frac1{\alpha} ( \mathrm{id} - J_{\alpha} ).$$

For each α > 0 and x ∈ H, let

$$\varphi_{\alpha} (x) = \inf_{y \in H} \frac1{2 \alpha} \| y - x \|^{2} + \varphi (y).$$

Then

$$\varphi_{\alpha} (x) = \frac{\alpha}{2} \| A_{\alpha} x \|^{2} + \varphi (J_{\alpha} (x))$$

and φ_{α} is convex and Fréchet differentiable with derivative dφ_{α} = A_{α}. Also, for each x ∈ H (pointwise), φ_{α}(x) converges upwards to φ(x) as α → 0.
