= Closed convex function =

Terms in Maths

In mathematics, a function $f: \mathbb{R}^n \rightarrow \mathbb{R}$ is said to be closed if for each $\alpha \in \mathbb{R}$, the sublevel set $\{ x \in \mbox{dom} f \vert f(x) \leq \alpha \}$ is a closed set.

Equivalently, if the epigraph defined by $\mbox{epi} f = \{ (x,t) \in \mathbb{R}^{n+1} \vert x \in \mbox{dom} f,\; f(x) \leq t\}$ is closed, then the function $f$ is closed.

This definition is valid for any function, but most used for convex functions. A proper convex function is closed if and only if it is lower semi-continuous.

== Properties ==
- If $f: \mathbb{R}^n \rightarrow \mathbb{R}$ is a continuous function and $\mbox{dom} f$ is closed, then $f$ is closed.
- If $f: \mathbb R^n \rightarrow \mathbb R$ is a continuous function and $\mbox{dom} f$ is open, then $f$ is closed if and only if it converges to $\infty$ along every sequence converging to a boundary point of $\mbox{dom} f$.
- A closed proper convex function f is the pointwise supremum of the collection of all affine functions h such that h ≤ f (called the affine minorants of f).
