= Polynomial convexity =

Concept in several complex variables

In mathematics, especially in several complex variables, polynomial convexity is a notion of convexity for compact subsets of complex Euclidean space defined using complex polynomials. It is analogous to ordinary convexity, but instead of separating points by real affine functions or hyperplanes, it uses inequalities involving holomorphic polynomials.

== Definition ==
Let $K$ be a compact subset of $\mathbb{C}^n$. The polynomially convex hull of $K$ is the set

$$\widehat K
=
\{z\in\mathbb{C}^n : |p(z)|\leq \sup_{w\in K}|p(w)| \text{ for every complex polynomial } p\}.$$

The set $K$ is called polynomially convex if

$\widehat K=K.$

Equivalently, $K$ is polynomially convex if every point outside $K$ can be separated from $K$ by a polynomial: for every $z\notin K$, there is a polynomial $p$ such that

$$|p(z)|>\sup_{w\in K}|p(w)|.$$

== Examples ==
Every compact polynomially convex set is equal to the intersection of all polynomial inequalities that contain it. Basic examples include closed polydiscs and many compact convex subsets of $\mathbb{C}^n$. If $K$ is the distinguished boundary of the unit polydisc,

$$K=\{(z_1,\ldots,z_n): |z_1|=\cdots=|z_n|=1\},$$

then its polynomially convex hull is the closed unit polydisc

$$\widehat K=\{(z_1,\ldots,z_n): |z_j|\leq 1,\ j=1,\ldots,n\}.$$

In one complex variable, polynomial convexity has a particularly simple topological description. If $K\subset\mathbb{C}$ is compact, then $\widehat K$ is obtained from $K$ by filling in the bounded connected components of $\mathbb{C}\setminus K$. Thus a compact subset of the complex plane is polynomially convex if and only if its complement has no bounded components.

== Relation to approximation ==
Polynomial convexity is important because of its connection with uniform approximation by holomorphic polynomials. In the special case of compact subsets of $\mathbb C^n$, the Oka–Weil theorem states that if $K$ is polynomially convex, then every function holomorphic on a neighbourhood of $K$ can be uniformly approximated on $K$ by holomorphic polynomials. More generally, on a Stein manifold, polynomial convexity is replaced by $\mathcal O(X)$-convexity, and approximation is by global holomorphic functions on $X$.

This generalizes classical approximation theorems in one complex variable, such as Runge's theorem and Mergelyan's theorem, to compact subsets of higher-dimensional complex spaces.
