= Slater's condition =

Concept in convex optimization

In mathematics, Slater's condition (or Slater condition) is a sufficient condition for strong duality to hold for a convex optimization problem, named after Morton L. Slater. Informally, Slater's condition states that the feasible region must have an interior point (see technical details below).

Slater's condition is a specific example of a constraint qualification. In particular, if Slater's condition holds for the primal problem, then the duality gap is zero, and if the dual value is finite then it is attained.

== Formulation ==
Let $f_1,\ldots,f_m$ be real-valued functions on some subset $D$ of $\mathbb{R}^n$. We say that the functions satisfy the Slater condition if there exists some $x$ in the relative interior of $D$, for which $f_i(x) < 0$ for all $i$ in $1,\ldots,m$. We say that the functions satisfy the relaxed Slater condition if:

- Some $k$ functions (say $f_1,\ldots,f_k$) are affine;
- There exists $x \in \operatorname{relint} D$ such that $f_i(x) \le 0$ for all $i=1,\ldots,k$, and $f_i(x) < 0$ for all $i=k+1,\ldots,m$.

== Application to convex optimization ==
Consider the optimization problem

$$\text{Minimize }\; f_0(x)$$
$\text{subject to: }\$

$$f_i(x) \le 0 , i = 1,\ldots,m$$
$$Ax = b$$

where $f_0,\ldots,f_m$ are convex functions. This is an instance of convex programming. Slater's condition for convex programming states that there exists an $x^*$ that is strictly feasible, that is, all m constraints are satisfied, and the nonlinear constraints are satisfied with strict inequalities.

If a convex program satisfies Slater's condition (or relaxed condition), and it is bounded from below, then strong duality holds. Mathematically, this states that strong duality holds if there exists an $x^* \in \operatorname{relint}(D)$ (where relint denotes the relative interior of the convex set $D := \cap_{i = 0}^m \operatorname{dom}(f_i)$) such that

$f_i(x^*) < 0, i = 1,\ldots,m,$ (the convex, nonlinear constraints)
$Ax^* = b.\,$

== Generalized Inequalities ==
Given the problem

$$\text{Minimize }\; f_0(x)$$
$\text{subject to: }\$

$$f_i(x) \le_{K_i} 0 , i = 1,\ldots,m$$
$$Ax = b$$

where $f_0$ is convex and $f_i$ is $K_i$-convex for each $i$. Then Slater's condition says that if there exists an $x^* \in \operatorname{relint}(D)$ such that

$f_i(x^*) <_{K_i} 0, i = 1,\ldots,m$ and
$$Ax^* = b$$

then strong duality holds.

== See also ==
- Duality
- Karush–Kuhn–Tucker conditions
- Lagrange multiplier
