= Indicator function (convex analysis) =

In the field of mathematics known as convex analysis, the indicator function of a set is a convex function that indicates the membership (or non-membership) of a given element in that set. It is similar to the indicator function used in probability, but assigns $+ \infty$ instead of $0$ to the outside elements.

Each field seems to have its own meaning of an "indicator function", as in complex analysis for instance.

== Definition ==
Let $X$ be a set, and let $A$ be a subset of $X$. The indicator function of $A$ is the function

$$\iota_{A} : X \to \mathbb{R} \cup \{ + \infty \}$$

taking values in the extended real number line defined by

$$\iota_{A} (x) := \begin{cases} 0, & x \in A; \\ + \infty, & x \not \in A. \end{cases}$$

== Properties ==
This function is convex if and only if the set $A$ is convex.

This function is lower-semicontinuous if and only if the set $A$ is closed.

For any arbitrary sets $A$ and $B$, it is that $\iota_A + \iota_B = \iota_{A\cap B}$.

For an arbitrary non-empty set its Legendre transform is the support function.

The subgradient of $\iota_{A} (x)$ for a set $A$ and $x\in A$ is the normal cone of that set at $x$.

Its infimal convolution with the Euclidean norm $||\cdot||_2$ is the Euclidean distance to that set.

== Bibliography ==
- Rockafellar, R. T. (1997) [1970]. Convex Analysis. Princeton, NJ: Princeton University Press. ISBN 978-0-691-01586-6.
- Hiriart-Urruty, J. B.; Lemaréchal, C. (1993). Convex Analysis and Minimization Algorithms I & II. Springer-Verlag.
- Boyd, S. P.; Vandenberghe, L. (2004). Convex Optimization. Cambridge University Press.
- Bauschke, H. H.; Combettes, P. L. (2011). Convex Analysis and Monotone Operator Theory in Hilbert Spaces. Springer.
