= Proper convex function =

Concept in convex analysis

In mathematical analysis, in particular the subfields of convex analysis and optimization, a proper convex function is an extended real-valued convex function with a non-empty domain, that never takes on the value $-\infty$ and also is not identically equal to $+\infty.$

In convex analysis and variational analysis, a point (in the domain) at which some given function $f$ is minimized is typically sought, where $f$ is valued in the extended real number line $[-\infty, \infty] = \mathbb{R} \cup \{ \pm\infty \}.$ Such a point, if it exists, is called a global minimum point of the function and its value at this point is called the global minimum (value) of the function. If the function takes $-\infty$ as a value then $-\infty$ is necessarily the global minimum value and the minimization problem can be answered; this is ultimately the reason why the definition of "proper" requires that the function never take $-\infty$ as a value. Assuming this, if the function's domain is empty or if the function is identically equal to $+\infty$ then the minimization problem once again has an immediate answer. Extended real-valued function for which the minimization problem is not solved by any one of these three trivial cases are exactly those that are called proper. Many (although not all) results whose hypotheses require that the function be proper add this requirement specifically to exclude these trivial cases.

If the problem is instead a maximization problem (which would be clearly indicated, such as by the function being concave rather than convex) then the definition of "proper" is defined in an analogous (albeit technically different) manner but with the same goal: to exclude cases where the maximization problem can be answered immediately. Specifically, a concave function $g$ is called proper if its negation $-g,$ which is a convex function, is proper in the sense defined above.

== Definitions ==
Suppose that $f : X \to [-\infty, \infty]$ is a function taking values in the extended real number line $[-\infty, \infty] = \mathbb{R} \cup \{ \pm\infty \}.$ If $f$ is a convex function or if a minimum point of $f$ is being sought, then $f$ is called proper if

$f(x) > -\infty$ for every $x \in X$

and if there also exists some point $x_0 \in X$ such that

$$f\left( x_0 \right) < +\infty.$$

That is, a function is proper if it never attains the value $-\infty$ and its effective domain is nonempty. This means that there exists some $x \in X$ at which $f(x) \in \mathbb{R}$ and $f$ is also never equal to $-\infty.$ Convex functions that are not proper are called improper convex functions.

A proper concave function is by definition, any function $g : X \to [-\infty, \infty]$ such that $f := -g$ is a proper convex function. Explicitly, if $g : X \to [-\infty, \infty]$ is a concave function or if a maximum point of $g$ is being sought, then $g$ is called proper if its domain is not empty, it never takes on the value $+\infty,$ and it is not identically equal to $-\infty.$

== Properties ==
For every proper convex function $f : \mathbb{R}^n \to [-\infty, \infty],$ there exist some $b \in \mathbb{R}^n$ and $r \in \mathbb{R}$ such that

$$f(x) \geq x \cdot b - r$$

for every $x \in \mathbb{R}^n.$

The sum of two proper convex functions is convex, but not necessarily proper. For instance if the sets $A \subset X$ and $B \subset X$ are non-empty convex sets in the vector space $X,$ then the characteristic functions $I_A$ and $I_B$ are proper convex functions, but if $A \cap B = \varnothing$ then $I_A + I_B$ is identically equal to $+\infty.$

The infimal convolution of two proper convex functions is convex but not necessarily proper convex.

== See also ==
- Effective domain
