= Max–min inequality =

Mathematical inequality

In mathematics, the max–min inequality is as follows:

For any function $\ f : Z \times W \to \mathbb{R}\ ,$

$$\sup_{z \in Z} \inf_{w \in W} f(z, w) \leq \inf_{w \in W} \sup_{z \in Z} f(z, w)\ .$$

When equality holds one says that f, W, and Z satisfies a strong max–min property (or a saddle-point property). The example function $\ f(z,w) = \sin( z + w )\$ illustrates that the equality does not hold for every function.

A theorem giving conditions on f, W, and Z which guarantee the saddle point property is called a minimax theorem.

== Proof ==
Define $g(z) \triangleq \inf_{w \in W} f(z, w)\ .$ For all $z \in Z$, we get $g(z) \leq f(z, w)$ for all $w \in W$ by definition of the infimum being a lower bound. Next, for all $w \in W$, $f(z, w) \leq \sup_{z \in Z} f(z, w)$ for all $z \in Z$ by definition of the supremum being an upper bound. Thus, for all $z \in Z$ and $w \in W$, $g(z) \leq f(z, w) \leq \sup_{z \in Z} f(z, w)$ making $h(w) \triangleq \sup_{z \in Z} f(z, w)$ an upper bound on $g(z)$ for any choice of $w \in W$. Because the supremum is the least upper bound, $\sup_{z \in Z} g(z) \leq h(w)$ holds for all $w \in W$. From this inequality, we also see that $\sup_{z \in Z} g(z)$ is a lower bound on $h(w)$. By the greatest lower bound property of infimum, $\sup_{z \in Z} g(z) \leq \inf_{w \in W} h(w)$. Putting all the pieces together, we get

$\sup_{z \in Z} \inf_{w \in W} f(z, w) = \sup_{z \in Z} g(z) \leq \inf_{w \in W} h(w) = \inf_{w \in W} \sup_{z \in Z} f(z, w)$

which proves the desired inequality. $\blacksquare$

== See also ==
- Minimax theorem
