= Strong duality =

Condition in mathematical optimization

Strong duality is a condition in mathematical optimization in which the primal optimal objective and the dual optimal objective are equal. By definition, strong duality holds if and only if the duality gap is equal to 0. This is opposed to weak duality (the primal problem has optimal value greater than or equal to the dual problem, in other words the duality gap is greater than or equal to zero).

== Sufficient conditions ==
Each of the following conditions is sufficient for strong duality to hold:

- $F = F^{**}$ where $F$ is the perturbation function relating the primal and dual problems and $F^{**}$ is the biconjugate of $F$ (follows by construction of the duality gap)
- $F$ is convex and lower semi-continuous (equivalent to the first point by the Fenchel–Moreau theorem)
- the primal problem is a linear optimization problem
- Slater's condition for a convex optimization problem.

== Strong duality and computational complexity ==
Under certain conditions (called "constraint qualification"), if a problem is polynomial-time solvable, then it has strong duality (in the sense of Lagrangian duality). It is an open question whether the opposite direction also holds, that is, if strong duality implies polynomial-time solvability.

== See also ==
- Convex optimization
- Linear programming#Duality
- Dual linear program
