= Convexity in economics =

Significant topic in economics

Convexity is a geometric property with a variety of applications in economics. Informally, an economic phenomenon is convex when "intermediates (or combinations) are better than extremes". For example, an economic agent with convex preferences prefers combinations of goods over having a lot of any one sort of good; this represents a kind of diminishing marginal utility of having more of the same good.

Convexity is a key simplifying assumption in many economic models, as it leads to market behavior that is easy to understand and which has desirable properties. For example, the Arrow–Debreu model of general economic equilibrium posits that if preferences are convex and there is perfect competition, then aggregate supplies will equal aggregate demands for every commodity in the economy. In contrast, non-convexity is associated with market failures, where supply and demand differ or where market equilibria can be inefficient.

The branch of mathematics which supplies the tools for convex functions and their properties is called convex analysis; non-convex phenomena are studied under nonsmooth analysis.

== Optimal basket ==
The consumer prefers the vector of goods (Q_{x}, Q_{y}) over other affordable vectors. At this optimal vector, the budget line supports the indifference curve I_{2}.

An optimal basket of goods occurs where the consumer's convex preference set is supported by the budget constraint, as shown in the diagram. If the preference set is convex, then the consumer's set of optimal decisions is a convex set, for example, a unique optimal basket (or even a line segment of optimal baskets).

For simplicity, we shall assume that the preferences of a consumer can be described by a utility function that is a continuous function, which implies that the preference sets are closed. (The meanings of "closed set" is explained below, in the subsection on optimization applications.)

== Non-convexity ==
When consumer preferences have concavities, then the linear budgets need not support equilibria: Consumers can jump between allocations.

If a preference set is non‑convex, then some prices produce a budget supporting two different optimal consumption decisions. For example, we can imagine that, for zoos, a lion costs as much as an eagle, and further that a zoo's budget suffices for one eagle or one lion. We can suppose also that a zoo-keeper views either animal as equally valuable. In this case, the zoo would purchase either one lion or one eagle. Of course, a contemporary zoo-keeper does not want to purchase a half an eagle and a half a lion (or a griffin)! Thus, the contemporary zoo-keeper's preferences are non‑convex: The zoo-keeper prefers having either animal to having any strictly convex combination of both.

Non‑convex sets have been incorporated in the theories of general economic equilibria, of market failures, and of public economics. These results are described in graduate-level textbooks in microeconomics, general equilibrium theory, game theory, mathematical economics, and applied mathematics (for economists). The Shapley–Folkman lemma results establish that non‑convexities are compatible with approximate equilibria in markets with many consumers; these results also apply to production economies with many small firms.

In "oligopolies" (markets dominated by a few producers), especially in "monopolies" (markets dominated by one producer), non‑convexities remain important. Concerns with large producers exploiting market power in fact initiated the literature on non‑convex sets, when Piero Sraffa wrote about on firms with increasing returns to scale in 1926, after which Harold Hotelling wrote about marginal cost pricing in 1938. Both Sraffa and Hotelling illuminated the market power of producers without competitors, clearly stimulating a literature on the supply-side of the economy. Non‑convex sets arise also with environmental goods (and other externalities), with information economics, and with stock markets (and other incomplete markets). Such applications continued to motivate economists to study non‑convex sets.

=== Nonsmooth analysis ===
Economists have increasingly studied non‑convex sets with nonsmooth analysis, which generalizes convex analysis. "Non‑convexities in [both] production and consumption ... required mathematical tools that went beyond convexity, and further development had to await the invention of non‑smooth calculus" (for example, Francis Clarke's locally Lipschitz calculus), as described by Rockafellar & Wets (1998) and Mordukhovich (2006), according to Khan (2008). Brown (1991, pp. 1967–1968) wrote that the "major methodological innovation in the general equilibrium analysis of firms with pricing rules" was "the introduction of the methods of non‑smooth analysis, as a [synthesis] of global analysis (differential topology) and [of] convex analysis." According to Brown (1991, p. 1966), "Non‑smooth analysis extends the local approximation of manifolds by tangent planes [and extends] the analogous approximation of convex sets by tangent cones to sets" that can be non‑smooth or non‑convex. Economists have also used algebraic topology.

== See also ==
- Convex duality
