= Non-convexity (economics) =

Violations of the convexity assumptions of elementary economics

In economics, non-convexity refers to violations of the convexity assumptions of elementary economics. Basic economics textbooks concentrate on consumers with convex preferences (that do not prefer extremes to in-between values) and convex budget sets and on producers with convex production sets; for convex models, the predicted economic behavior is well understood. When convexity assumptions are violated, then many of the good properties of competitive markets need not hold: Thus, non-convexity is associated with market failures, where supply and demand differ or where market equilibria can be inefficient. Non-convex economies are studied with nonsmooth analysis, which is a generalization of convex analysis.

== Demand with many consumers ==
If a preference set is non-convex, then some prices determine a budget-line that supports two separate optimal-baskets. For example, we can imagine that, for zoos, a lion costs as much as an eagle, and further that a zoo's budget suffices for one eagle or one lion. We can suppose also that a zoo-keeper views either animal as equally valuable. In this case, the zoo would purchase either one lion or one eagle. Of course, a contemporary zoo-keeper does not want to purchase half of an eagle and half of a lion. Thus, the zoo-keeper's preferences are non-convex: The zoo-keeper prefers having either animal to having any strictly convex combination of both.

When consumer preferences have concavities, then the linear budgets need not support an equilibrium: Consumers can jump between two separate allocations (of equal utility).

When the consumer's preference set is non-convex, then (for some prices) the consumer's demand is not connected; A disconnected demand implies some discontinuous behavior by the consumer, as discussed by Harold Hotelling:

If indifference curves for purchases be thought of as possessing a wavy character, convex to the origin in some regions and concave in others, we are forced to the conclusion that it is only the portions convex to the origin that can be regarded as possessing any importance, since the others are essentially unobservable. They can be detected only by the discontinuities that may occur in demand with variation in price-ratios, leading to an abrupt jumping of a point of tangency across a chasm when the straight line is rotated. But, while such discontinuities may reveal the existence of chasms, they can never measure their depth. The concave portions of the indifference curves and their many-dimensional generalizations, if they exist, must forever remain in unmeasurable obscurity.

The difficulties of studying non-convex preferences were emphasized by Herman Wold and again by Paul Samuelson, who wrote that non-convexities are "shrouded in eternal darkness ...", according to Diewert.

When convexity assumptions are violated, then many of the good properties of competitive markets need not hold: Thus, non-convexity is associated with market failures, where supply and demand differ or where market equilibria can be inefficient. Non-convex preferences were illuminated from 1959 to 1961 by a sequence of papers in The Journal of Political Economy (JPE). The main contributors were Michael Farrell, Francis Bator, Tjalling Koopmans, and Jerome Rothenberg. In particular, Rothenberg's paper discussed the approximate convexity of sums of non-convex sets. These JPE-papers stimulated a paper by Lloyd Shapley and Martin Shubik, which considered convexified consumer-preferences and introduced the concept of an "approximate equilibrium". The JPE-papers and the Shapley–Shubik paper influenced another notion of "quasi-equilibria", due to Robert Aumann.

Non-convex sets have been incorporated in the theories of general economic equilibria. These results are described in graduate-level textbooks in microeconomics, general equilibrium theory, game theory, mathematical economics, and applied mathematics (for economists). The Shapley–Folkman lemma establishes that non-convexities are compatible with approximate equilibria in markets with many consumers; these results also apply to production economies with many small firms.

== Supply with few producers ==
Non-convexity is important under oligopolies and especially monopolies. Concerns with large producers exploiting market power initiated the literature on non-convex sets, when Piero Sraffa wrote about on firms with increasing returns to scale in 1926, after which Harold Hotelling wrote about marginal cost pricing in 1938. Both Sraffa and Hotelling illuminated the market power of producers without competitors, clearly stimulating a literature on the supply-side of the economy.

== Contemporary economics ==
Recent research in economics has recognized non-convexity in new areas of economics. In these areas, non-convexity is associated with market failures, where equilibria need not be efficient or where no competitive equilibrium exists because supply and demand differ. Non-convex sets arise also with environmental goods (and other externalities), and with market failures, and public economics. Non-convexities occur also with information economics, and with stock markets (and other incomplete markets). Such applications continued to motivate economists to study non-convex sets. In some cases, non-linear pricing or bargaining may overcome the failures of markets with competitive pricing; in other cases, regulation may be justified.

=== Optimization over time ===
The previously mentioned applications concern non-convexities in finite-dimensional vector spaces, where points represent commodity bundles. However, economists also consider dynamic problems of optimization over time, using the theories of differential equations, dynamic systems, stochastic processes, and functional analysis: Economists use the following optimization methods:

- calculus of variations, following Frank P. Ramsey and Harold Hotelling;
- dynamic programming, following Richard Bellman and Ronald Howard; and
- control theory.

In these theories, regular problems involve convex functions defined on convex domains, and this convexity allows simplifications of techniques and economic meaningful interpretations of the results. In economics, dynamic programing was used by Martin Beckmann and Richard F. Muth for work on inventory theory and consumption theory. Robert C. Merton used dynamic programming in his 1973 article on the intertemporal capital asset pricing model. (See also Merton's portfolio problem). In Merton's model, investors chose between income today and future income or capital gains, and their solution is found via dynamic programming. Stokey, Lucas & Prescott use dynamic programming to solve problems in economic theory, problems involving stochastic processes. Dynamic programming has been used in optimal economic growth, resource extraction, principal–agent problems, public finance, business investment, asset pricing, factor supply, and industrial organization. Ljungqvist & Sargent apply dynamic programming to study a variety of theoretical questions in monetary policy, fiscal policy, taxation, economic growth, search theory, and labor economics. Dixit & Pindyck used dynamic programming for capital budgeting. For dynamic problems, non-convexities also are associated with market failures, just as they are for fixed-time problems.

=== Nonsmooth analysis ===
Economists have increasingly studied non-convex sets with nonsmooth analysis, which generalizes convex analysis. Convex analysis centers on convex sets and convex functions, for which it provides powerful ideas and clear results, but it is not adequate for the analysis of non-convexities, such as increasing returns to scale. "Non-convexities in [both] production and consumption ... required mathematical tools that went beyond convexity, and further development had to await the invention of non-smooth calculus": For example, Clarke's differential calculus for Lipschitz continuous functions, which uses Rademacher's theorem and which is described by Rockafellar & Wets (1998) and Mordukhovich (2006), according to Khan (2008). Brown (1995, pp. 1967–1968) wrote that the "major methodological innovation in the general equilibrium analysis of firms with pricing rules" was "the introduction of the methods of non-smooth analysis, as a [synthesis] of global analysis (differential topology) and [of] convex analysis." According to Brown (1995, p. 1966), "Non-smooth analysis extends the local approximation of manifolds by tangent planes [and extends] the analogous approximation of convex sets by tangent cones to sets" that can be non-smooth or non-convex.

== See also ==
- Convexity in economics
- Shapley–Folkman lemma
