= Shapley–Folkman lemma =

Sums of sets of vectors are nearly convex

The Shapley–Folkman lemma is illustrated by the Minkowski addition of four sets. The point (+) in the convex hull of the Minkowski sum of the four non-convex sets (right) is the sum of four points (+) from the (left-hand) sets—two points in two non-convex sets plus two points in the convex hulls of two sets. The convex hulls are shaded pink. The original sets each have exactly two points (shown as red dots).

The Shapley–Folkman lemma is a result in convex geometry that describes the Minkowski addition of sets in a vector space. The lemma may be intuitively understood as saying that, if the number of summed sets exceeds the dimension of the vector space, then their Minkowski sum is approximately convex. It is named after mathematicians Lloyd Shapley and Jon Folkman, but was first published by the economist Ross M. Starr.

Related results provide more refined statements about how close the approximation is. For example, the Shapley–Folkman theorem provides an upper bound on the distance between any point in the Minkowski sum and its convex hull. This upper bound is sharpened by the Shapley–Folkman–Starr theorem (alternatively, Starr's corollary).

The Shapley–Folkman lemma has applications in economics, optimization and probability theory. In economics, it can be used to extend results proved for convex preferences to non-convex preferences. In optimization theory, it can be used to explain the successful solution of minimization problems that are sums of many functions. In probability, it can be used to prove a law of large numbers for random sets.

== Introductory example ==
A set is said to be convex if every line segment joining two of its points is a subset in the set. The solid disk $\bullet$ is a convex set, but the circle $\circ$ is not, because the line segment joining two distinct points $\oslash$ is not a subset of the circle. The convex hull of a set $Q$ is the smallest convex set that contains $Q$.

Minkowski addition is an operation on sets that forms the set of sums of members of the sets, with one member from each set. For example, adding the set consisting of the integers zero and one to itself yields the set consisting of zero, one, and two:
$$\{0, 1\} + \{0, 1\} = \{0 + 0, 0 + 1, 1 + 0, 1 + 1\} = \{0, 1, 2\}.$$
This subset of the integers $\{0,1,2\}$ is contained in the interval of real numbers $[0,2]$, which is its convex hull. The Shapley–Folkman lemma implies that every point in $[0,2]$ is the sum of an integer from $\{0,1\}$ and a real number from $[0,1]$: to get the convex hull of the Minkowski sum of $\{0,1\}$ with itself, only one of the summands needs to be replaced by its convex hull.

The non-convex set $\{0,1\}$ and its convex hull $[0,1]$ are at Hausdorff distance $\tfrac12$ from each other, and this distance remains the same for the non-convex set $\{0,1,2\}$ and its convex hull $[0,2]$. In both cases the convex hull contains points such as $\tfrac12$ that are at distance $\tfrac12$ from the members of the non-convex set. In this example, the Minkowski sum operation does not decrease the distance between the sum and its convex hull. But when summing is replaced by averaging, by scaling the sum by the number of terms in the sum, the distance between the scaled Minkowski sum and its convex hull does go down. The distance between the average Minkowski sum
$$\frac{1}{2} \left( \{0,1\} + \{0,1\} \right) = \left\{ 0, \tfrac{1}{2}, 1 \right\}$$
and its convex hull $[0,1]$ is only $\tfrac14$, which is half the distance $\tfrac12$ between its summand $\{0,1\}$ and its convex hull $[0,1]$. As more sets are added together, the average of their sum "fills out" its convex hull: The maximum distance between the average and its convex hull approaches zero as the average includes more summands. This reduction in distance can be stated more formally as the Shapley–Folkman theorem and Shapley–Folkman–Starr theorem, as consequences of the Shapley–Folkman lemma.

== Preliminaries ==
The Shapley–Folkman lemma depends upon the following definitions and results from convex geometry.

=== Real vector spaces ===
A real vector space of two dimensions can be given a Cartesian coordinate system in which every point is identified by an ordered pair of real numbers, called "coordinates", which are conventionally denoted by $x$ and $y$. Two points in the Cartesian plane can be added coordinate-wise:
$$(x_1,y_1) + (x_2,y_2) = (x_1 + x_2, y_1 + y_2);$$
further, a point can be multiplied by each real number $\lambda$ coordinate-wise:
$$\lambda (x, y) = (\lambda x, \lambda y).$$

More generally, any real vector space of (finite) dimension $D$ can be viewed as the set of all $D$-tuples of $D$ real numbers $(x_1,x_2,\ldots,x_D)$ on which two operations are defined: vector addition and multiplication by a real number. For finite-dimensional vector spaces, the operations of vector addition and real-number multiplication can each be defined coordinate-wise, following the example of the Cartesian plane.

=== Convex sets ===
In a convex set Q, the line segment connecting any two of its points is a subset of Q.

In a non-convex set Q, a point in some line-segment joining two of its points is not a member of Q.

Line segments test whether a subset is convex.

In a real vector space, a non-empty set $Q$ is defined to be convex if, for each pair of its points, every point on the line segment that joins them is still in $Q$. For example, a solid disk $\bullet$ is convex but a circle $\circ$ is not, because it does not contain a line segment joining opposite points. A solid cube is convex; however, anything that is hollow or dented, for example, a crescent shape, is non-convex. The empty set is convex, either by definition or vacuously.

More formally, a set $Q$ is convex if, for all points $q_1$ and $q_2$ in $Q$ and for every real number $\lambda$ in the unit interval $[0,1]$, the point
$$(1 - \lambda) q_1 + \lambda q_2$$
is a member of $Q$. By mathematical induction, a set $Q$ is convex if and only if every convex combination of members of $Q$ also belongs to $Q$. By definition, a convex combination of indexed points $v_1,v_2,\ldots v_D$ of a vector space is any weighted average $\lambda_1 v_1+\lambda_2 v_2+\cdots+\lambda_D v_D$ for indexed real numbers $\lambda_1,\lambda_2,\ldots \lambda_D$ satisfying the equation $\lambda_1+\lambda_2+\cdots+\lambda_D=1$.

The definition of a convex set implies that the intersection of two convex sets is a convex set. More generally, the intersection of a family of convex sets is a convex set. In particular, the intersection of two disjoint sets is the empty set, which is convex.

=== Convex hull ===
In the convex hull of the red set, each blue point is a convex combination of some red points.

For every subset $Q$ of a real vector space, its convex hull $\operatorname{conv}Q$ is the minimal convex set that contains $Q$. Thus $\operatorname{conv} Q$ is the intersection of all the convex sets that cover $Q$. The convex hull of a set can be equivalently defined to be the set of all convex combinations of points in $Q$. For example, the convex hull of the set of integers $\{0,1\}$ is the closed interval of real numbers $[0,1]$, which has the maximum and minimum of the given set as its endpoints. The convex hull of the unit circle is the closed unit disk, which contains the unit circle and its interior.

=== Minkowski addition ===
Minkowski addition of sets. The sum of the squares $Q_{1}=[0,1]^{2}$ and $Q_{2}=[1,2]^{2}$ is the square $Q_{1}+Q_{2}=[1,3]^{2}$.

In any vector space (or algebraic structure with addition), $X$, the Minkowski sum of two non-empty sets $A,B\subseteq X$ is defined to be the element-wise operation
$$A+B=\{x+y\mid x\in A,y\in B\}.$$
For example,
$$\begin{align}
\{0,1\}+\{0,1\}&=\{0+0,0+1,1+0,1+1\}\\
&=\{0,1,2\}.
\end{align}$$
This operation is clearly commutative and associative on the collection of non-empty sets. All such operations extend in a well-defined manner to recursive forms $\sum_{n=1}^{N}Q_{n}=Q_{1}+Q_{2}+\ldots+Q_{N}.$ By the principle of induction,
$$\sum_{n=1}^{N}Q_{n}=\left\{\sum_{n=1}^{N}q_{n}\mathrel{\Bigg|}q_{n}\in Q_{n},~1\leq n\leq N\right\}.$$

=== Convex hulls of Minkowski sums ===
Minkowski addition behaves well with respect to taking convex hulls. Specifically, for all subsets $A,B\subseteq X$ of a real vector space, $X$, the convex hull of their Minkowski sum is the Minkowski sum of their convex hulls. That is,
$$\operatorname{conv} (A+B) = (\operatorname{conv}A)+(\operatorname{conv}B).$$
And by induction it follows that
$$\operatorname{conv}\sum_{n=1}^{N}Q_{n} = \sum_{n=1}^{N}\operatorname{conv}Q_{n}$$
for any $N\in\N$ and non-empty subsets $Q_n\in X,\ 1\le n\le N$.

== Statements of the three main results ==
=== Notation ===
In the following statements, $D$ and $N$ represent positive integers. $D$ is the dimension of the ambient space $\R^D$.

$Q_1,\dots,Q_N$ represent nonempty, bounded subsets of $\R^D$. They are also called "summands". $N$ is the number of summands.

$Q = \sum_{n=1}^N Q_n$ denotes the Minkowski sum of the summands.

The variable $x$ is used to represent an arbitrary vector in $\operatorname{conv}Q$.

=== Shapley–Folkman lemma ===
Because the convex hull and Minkowski sum operations can always be interchanged, as $\operatorname{conv}Q = \sum_{n=1}^{N}\operatorname{conv}(Q_{n})$, it follows that for every $x\in\operatorname{conv}Q$, there exist elements $q_n\in\operatorname{conv}Q_n$ such that $\sum_{n=1}^{N}q_{n}=x$. The Shapley–Folkman lemma refines this statement.

Shapley–Folkman lemma—For every $x\in\operatorname{conv}Q$, there exist elements $q_n$ such that $\sum_{n=1}^{N}q_{n}=x$, and such that at most $D$ of these elements $q_n$ belong to $(\operatorname{conv}Q_n)\setminus Q_n$, while each remaining element $q_n$ belongs to $Q_n$.

For example, every point in $[0,2]=[0,1]+[0,1]=\operatorname{conv}\{0,1\}+\operatorname{conv}\{0,1\}$ is the sum of an element in $\{0,1\}$ and an element in $[0,1]$.

Shuffling indices if necessary, this means that every point in $\operatorname{conv}Q$ can be decomposed as

$$x = \sum_{n=1}^{D}q_{n} + \sum_{n=D+1}^{N} q_n$$

where $q_n\in\operatorname{conv}Q_n$ for $1\le n\le D$ and $q_n\in\operatorname Q_n$ for $D+1\le n\le N$. Note that the reindexing depends on the point $x$.

The lemma may be stated succinctly as

$$\operatorname{conv}\left(\sum_{n=1}^{N}Q_{n}\right)\subseteq\bigcup_{I\subseteq\{1,2,\ldots N\}:~|I|=D}
\left(
\sum_{n\in I}\operatorname{conv}Q_{n}+\sum_{n\notin I}Q_{n}\right).$$

==== The converse of Shapley–Folkman lemma ====
converse of Shapley–Folkman lemma—If a vector space obeys the Shapley–Folkman lemma for a natural number $D$, and for no number less than $D$, then its dimension is finite, and exactly $D$.

In particular, the Shapley–Folkman lemma requires the vector space to be finite-dimensional.

=== Shapley–Folkman theorem ===
Shapley and Folkman used their lemma to prove the following theorem, which quantifies the difference between $Q$ and $\operatorname{conv}Q$ using Hausdorff distance. Hausdorff distances measure how close two sets are. For two sets $X$ and $Y$, the Hausdorff distance is, intuitively, the smallest amount by which each must be expanded to cover the other. More formally, if the distance from a point $x$ to a set $Y$ is defined as the infimum of pairwise distances,
$$d(x, Y) = \inf_{y\in Y}\|x-y\|,$$
then let $X_{\varepsilon}$ denote the set of all points within distance $\varepsilon$ of $X$; equivalently this is closure of the Minkowski sum of $X$ with a ball of radius $\varepsilon$. Then for $X\subset Y$, the Hausdorff distance is
$$d_{\mathrm{H}}(X,Y)=\inf \{\varepsilon\mid X_{\varepsilon}\supset Y\}.$$

The Shapley–Folkman theorem quantifies how close to convexity $Q$ is by upper-bounding its Hausdorff distance to $\operatorname{conv}Q$, using the circumradii of its constituent sets. For any bounded set $S \subset \R^D,$ define its circumradius $\operatorname{rad} S$ to be the smallest radius of a ball containing it. More formally, letting $x$ denote the center of the smallest enclosing ball, it can be defined as
$$\operatorname{rad} S= \inf\{\varepsilon\mid\exists x \in \mathbb{R}^N: \{x\}_{\varepsilon}\supset S\}.$$
With this notation in place, the Shapley–Folkman theorem can be stated as:

Shapley–Folkman theorem—$d_{\mathrm{H}}( Q, \operatorname{conv}Q)^2 ~\leq~ \sum_{\max D} (\operatorname{rad}Q_n)^2.$

Here the notation $\sum_{\max D}$ means "the sum of the $D$ largest terms". This upper bound depends on the dimension of ambient space and the shapes of the summands, but not on the number of summands.

=== Shapley–Folkman–Starr theorem ===
The circumradius (blue) and inner radius (green) of a point set (dark red, with its convex hull shown as the lighter red dashed lines). The inner radius is smaller than the circumradius except for subsets of a single circle, for which they are equal.

The Shapley–Folkman theorem can be strengthened by replacing the circumradius of the terms in a Minkowski by a smaller value, the inner radius, which intuitively measures the radius of the holes in a set rather than the radius of a set. Define the inner radius $r(S)$ of a bounded subset $S \subset \R^D$ to be the infimum of $r$ such that, for any $x\in \operatorname{conv}S$, there exists a ball $B$ of radius $r$ such that $x\in \operatorname{conv}(S \cap B)$.

Shapley–Folkman–Starr theorem—$d_{\mathrm{H}}(Q, \operatorname{conv}Q)^2 \leq \sum_{\max D} r(Q_n)^2$.

== Proofs ==
There have been many proofs of these results, from the original, to the later Arrow and Hahn, Cassels, Schneider, etc. An abstract and elegant proof by Ekeland has been extended by Artstein. Different proofs have also appeared in unpublished papers. An elementary proof of the Shapley–Folkman lemma can be found in the book by Bertsekas, together with applications in estimating the duality gap in separable optimization problems and zero-sum games.

Usual proofs of these results are nonconstructive: they establish only the existence of the representation, but do not provide an algorithm for computing the representation. In 1981, Starr published an iterative algorithm for a less sharp version of the Shapley–Folkman–Starr theorem.

=== Via Carathéodory's theorem ===
The following proof of Shapley–Folkman lemma is from Zhou (1993). The proof idea is to lift the representation of $x$ from $\R^{D}$to $\R^{D+N}$, use Carathéodory's theorem for conic hulls, then drop back to $\R^D$.

Proof of Shapley–Folkman lemma

For each $n$, represent $q_n \in \operatorname{conv}Q_n$ as $q_n = \sum_{k=1}^K w_{n, k} q_{n,k}$, where $K$ is a large finite number, $w_{n, k} \geq 0$, and $\sum_k w_{n, k} = 1$.

Now "lift" the representation $x = \sum_n \sum_k w_{n,k}q_{n,k}$ from $\R^D$ to $\R^{D+N}$. Define
$$\bar x = (x, 1, ..., 1);\quad \bar q_{n,k} = (q_{n,k}, e_n)$$
where $e_n$ is the vector in $\R^N$ that has 1 at coordinate $n$, and 0 at all other coordinates.

With this, we have a lifted representation

$$\bar x = \sum_{n}\sum_k w_{n,k} \bar q_{n,k}.$$
That is, $\bar x$ is in the conic hull of $\{\bar q_{n, k}\}_{n\in 1:N, k\in 1:K}$.

By Carathéodory's theorem for conic hulls, we have an alternative representation

$$\bar x = \sum_{n}\sum_k w'_{n,k}\bar q_{n,k}$$
such that $w'_{n,k} \geq 0$, and at most $N+D$ of them are nonzero. Since we defined

$$\bar x = (x, 1, ..., 1);\quad \bar q_{n,k} = (q_{n,k}, e_n)$$
this alternative representation is also a representation for $x$.

We argue that for any $n_0 \in 1:N$, there must be at least one value of $k$ for which $w'_{n_0, k}$ is nonzero. Remember that we defined $(\bar x)_{D + n_0}$, the $(D + n_0)$ entry of $\bar x$, to be $1$. At the same time, from the lifted representation of $\bar x$,
$$(\bar x)_{D + n_0} = \left(\sum_{n} \sum_{k}  w'_{n,k} \bar q_{n,k}\right)_{D+n_0}$$
$$= \sum_{n} \sum_{k}  w'_{n,k} (\bar q_{n,k})_{D+n_0}.$$
We drop all terms on the r.h.s. for which $n \neq n_0$ since they are zero. The remaining terms take the form $w'_{n_0,k} (\bar q_{n_0,k})_{D+n_0} = w'_{n_0, k}$, so we find the equation
$$1 = \sum_k w'_{n_0, k}.$$
It follows that there is at least one element of the sum on the r.h.s. that is non-zero.

Combining the fact that for each value of $n$ there is a non-zero $w_{n,k}'$, together with the fact that there are at most $N+D$ of $w_{n,k}'$ that are nonzero, we conclude that there can only be at most $D$ elements of $n\in 1:N$ for which there are at least two of $w_{n,k}'$ that are nonzero.

Thus we obtain a representation

$$\bar x = \sum_{n} \left(\sum_k w'_{n,k} \bar q_{n,k}\right)$$
where for at most $D$ of $n$, the term $\sum_k w'_{n,k} \bar q_{n,k}$ is not in $Q_n$.

=== Probabilistic ===
The following "probabilistic" proof of Shapley–Folkman–Starr theorem is from Cassels (1975).

We can interpret $\operatorname{conv}S$ in probabilistic terms: $\forall x \in \operatorname{conv}S$, since $x = \sum w_n q_n$ for some $q_n \in S$, we can define a random vector $X$, finitely supported in $S$, such that $Pr(X=q_n) = w_n$, and $x = \mathbb E[X]$.

Then, it is natural to consider the "variance" of a set $S$ as
$$\operatorname{Var}(S) := \sup_{x \in \operatorname{conv}S} \inf_{\mathbb E[X] = x, X\text{ is finitely supported in }S} \operatorname{Var}[X]$$
With that, $d(S, \operatorname{conv}(S))^2 \leq \operatorname{Var}(S) \leq r(S) \leq rad(S)$.

Proof

$d(S, \operatorname{conv}(S))^2 \leq \operatorname{Var}(S)$: Expand their definitions.

$\operatorname{Var}(S) \leq rad(S)$: if $x\in \operatorname{conv}(S)$ then let $X$ be finitely supported in $S$ such that $E[X] = x$. Now since $S$ is bounded in a ball of radius $rad(S)+\epsilon$ centered at some $o$, we have

$$\operatorname{Var}[X] = \operatorname{Var}[X-o] \leq E[\|X-o\|^2] \leq rad(S) + \epsilon.$$

$\operatorname{Var}(S) \leq r(S)$: use the previous result.

Proof of Shapley–Folkman–Starr theorem

It suffices to show $\operatorname{Var}\left(Q\right) \leq \sum_{\max D} \operatorname{Var}(Q_n)$.

For every $x \in \operatorname{conv}Q$, by Shapley–Folkman lemma, there exists a representation $x = \sum_{n\in I} x_n + \sum_{n \in J} q_n$, such that $I, J$ partitions $\{1, 2, ..., N\}$, $|I| \leq D$, $x_n \in \operatorname{conv}Q_n$, and $q_n\in Q_n$.

Now, for each $n\in I$, construct random vectors $X_n$ such that $X_n$ is finitely supported on $Q_n$, with $\mathbb E[X_n] = x_n$ and $\operatorname{Var}[X_n] < \operatorname{Var}[Q_n] + \epsilon$, where $\epsilon> 0$ is an arbitrary small number.

Let all such $X_n$ be independent. Then let $X = \sum_{n\in I} X_n + \sum_{n\in J} q_n$. Since each $q_n$ is a deterministic vector, we have

$$\operatorname{Var}[X] = \operatorname{Var}\left[\sum_{n\in I} X_n\right]= \sum_{n\in I} \operatorname{Var}\left[ X_n\right] \leq \sum_{n\in I}\left(\operatorname{Var}(Q_n) + \epsilon\right) \leq \sum_{\max D} \operatorname{Var}(Q_n) + D\epsilon.$$

Since this is true for arbitrary $\epsilon > 0$, we have $\operatorname{Var}[X] \leq \sum_{\max D} \operatorname{Var}(Q_n)$, and we are done.

== History ==
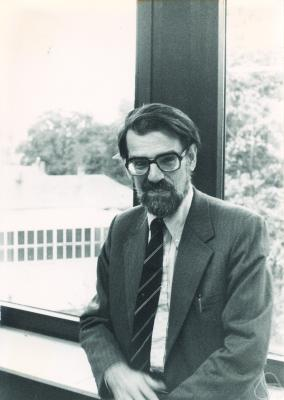
A Winner of the 2012 Nobel Award in Economics, Lloyd Shapley proved the Shapley–Folkman lemma with Jon Folkman.

The lemma of Lloyd Shapley and Jon Folkman was first published by the economist Ross M. Starr, who was investigating the existence of economic equilibria while studying with Kenneth Arrow. In his paper, Starr studied a convexified economy, in which non-convex sets were replaced by their convex hulls; Starr proved that the convexified economy has equilibria that are closely approximated by "quasi-equilibria" of the original economy; moreover, he proved that every quasi-equilibrium has many of the optimal properties of true equilibria, which are proved to exist for convex economies.

Following Starr's 1969 paper, the Shapley–Folkman–Starr results have been widely used to show that central results of (convex) economic theory are good approximations to large economies with non-convexities; for example, quasi-equilibria closely approximate equilibria of a convexified economy. "The derivation of these results in general form has been one of the major achievements of postwar economic theory", wrote Roger Guesnerie.

== Applications ==
The Shapley–Folkman lemma enables researchers to extend results for Minkowski sums of convex sets to sums of general sets, which need not be convex. Such sums of sets arise in economics, in mathematical optimization, and in probability theory; in each of these three mathematical sciences, non-convexity is an important feature of applications.

=== Economics ===
The consumer prefers every basket of goods on the indifference curve I_{3} over each basket on I_{2}. The basket (Q_{x}, Q_{y}), where the budget line (shown in blue) supports I_{2}, is optimal and also feasible, unlike any basket lying on I_{3} which is preferred but unfeasible.

In economics, a consumer's preferences are defined over all "baskets" of goods. Each basket is represented as a non-negative vector, whose coordinates represent the quantities of the goods. On this set of baskets, an indifference curve is defined for each consumer; a consumer's indifference curve contains all the baskets of commodities that the consumer regards as equivalent: That is, for every pair of baskets on the same indifference curve, the consumer does not prefer one basket over another. Through each basket of commodities passes one indifference curve. A consumer's preference set (relative to an indifference curve) is the union of the indifference curve and all the commodity baskets that the consumer prefers over the indifference curve. A consumer's preferences are convex if all such preference sets are convex.

An optimal basket of goods occurs where the budget-line supports a consumer's preference set, as shown in the diagram. This means that an optimal basket is on the highest possible indifference curve given the budget-line, which is defined in terms of a price vector and the consumer's income (endowment vector). Thus, the set of optimal baskets is a function of the prices, and this function is called the consumer's demand. If the preference set is convex, then at every price the consumer's demand is a convex set, for example, a unique optimal basket or a line-segment of baskets.

==== Non-convex preferences ====
When the consumer's preferences have concavities, the consumer may jump between two separate optimal baskets.

However, if a preference set is non-convex, then some prices determine a budget-line that supports two separate optimal-baskets. For example, we can imagine that, for zoos, a lion costs as much as an eagle, and further that a zoo's budget suffices for one eagle or one lion. We can suppose also that a zoo-keeper views either animal as equally valuable. In this case, the zoo would purchase either one lion or one eagle. Of course, a contemporary zoo-keeper does not want to purchase half of an eagle and half of a lion (or a griffin)! Thus, the zoo-keeper's preferences are non-convex: The zoo-keeper prefers having either animal to having any strictly convex combination of both.

When the consumer's preference set is non-convex, then (for some prices) the consumer's demand is not connected; a disconnected demand implies some discontinuous behavior by the consumer, as discussed by Harold Hotelling:

If indifference curves for purchases be thought of as possessing a wavy character, convex to the origin in some regions and concave in others, we are forced to the conclusion that it is only the portions convex to the origin that can be regarded as possessing any importance, since the others are essentially unobservable. They can be detected only by the discontinuities that may occur in demand with variation in price-ratios, leading to an abrupt jumping of a point of tangency across a chasm when the straight line is rotated. But, while such discontinuities may reveal the existence of chasms, they can never measure their depth. The concave portions of the indifference curves and their many-dimensional generalizations, if they exist, must forever remain in unmeasurable obscurity.

The difficulties of studying non-convex preferences were emphasized by Herman Wold and again by Paul Samuelson, who wrote that non-convexities are "shrouded in eternal darkness", (Note: "Eternal darkness" describes the Hell of John Milton's Paradise Lost, whose concavity is compared to the Serbonian Bog in Book II, lines 592–594: A gulf profound as that Serbonian Bog Betwixt Damiata and Mount Casius old, Where Armies whole have sunk. Milton's description of concavity serves as the literary epigraph prefacing chapter seven of Arrow & Hahn (1980, p. 169), "Markets with non-convex preferences and production", which presents the results of Starr (1969).) according to Diewert.

Nonetheless, non-convex preferences were illuminated from 1959 to 1961 by a sequence of papers in The Journal of Political Economy (JPE). The main contributors were Farrell, Bator, Koopmans, and Rothenberg. In particular, Rothenberg's paper discussed the approximate convexity of sums of non-convex sets. These JPE-papers stimulated a paper by Lloyd Shapley and Martin Shubik, which considered convexified consumer-preferences and introduced the concept of an "approximate equilibrium". The JPE-papers and the Shapley–Shubik paper influenced another notion of "quasi-equilibria", due to Robert Aumann.

==== Starr's 1969 paper and contemporary economics ====
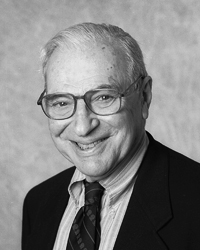
Kenneth Arrow (1972 Nobel laureate) helped Ross M. Starr to study non-convex economies.

Previous publications on non-convexity and economics were collected in an annotated bibliography by Kenneth Arrow. He gave the bibliography to Starr, who was then an undergraduate enrolled in Arrow's (graduate) advanced mathematical-economics course. In his term-paper, Starr studied the general equilibria of an artificial economy in which non-convex preferences were replaced by their convex hulls. In the convexified economy, at each price, the aggregate demand was the sum of convex hulls of the consumers' demands. Starr's ideas interested the mathematicians Lloyd Shapley and Jon Folkman, who proved their eponymous lemma and theorem in "private correspondence", which was reported by Starr's published paper of 1969.

In his 1969 publication, Starr applied the Shapley–Folkman–Starr theorem. Starr proved that the "convexified" economy has general equilibria that can be closely approximated by "quasi-equilibria" of the original economy, when the number of agents exceeds the dimension of the goods: Concretely, Starr proved that there exists at least one quasi-equilibrium of prices $p_{\mathrm{opt}}$ with the following properties:

- For each quasi-equilibrium's prices $p_{\mathrm{opt}}$, all consumers can choose optimal baskets (maximally preferred and meeting their budget constraints).
- At quasi-equilibrium prices $p_{\mathrm{opt}}$ in the convexified economy, every good's market is in equilibrium: Its supply equals its demand.
- For each quasi-equilibrium, the prices "nearly clear" the markets for the original economy: an upper bound on the distance between the set of equilibria of the "convexified" economy and the set of quasi-equilibria of the original economy followed from Starr's corollary to the Shapley–Folkman theorem.

Starr established that

"in the aggregate, the discrepancy between an allocation in the fictitious economy generated by [taking the convex hulls of all of the consumption and production sets] and some allocation in the real economy is bounded in a way that is independent of the number of economic agents. Therefore, the average agent experiences a deviation from intended actions that vanishes in significance as the number of agents goes to infinity".

Following Starr's 1969 paper, the Shapley–Folkman–Starr results have been widely used in economic theory. Roger Guesnerie summarized their economic implications: "Some key results obtained under the convexity assumption remain (approximately) relevant in circumstances where convexity fails. For example, in economies with a large consumption side, preference nonconvexities do not destroy the standard results". "The derivation of these results in general form has been one of the major achievements of postwar economic theory", wrote Guesnerie. The topic of non-convex sets in economics has been studied by many Nobel laureates: Arrow (1972), Robert Aumann (2005), Gérard Debreu (1983), Tjalling Koopmans (1975), Paul Krugman (2008), and Paul Samuelson (1970); the complementary topic of convex sets in economics has been emphasized by these laureates, along with Leonid Hurwicz, Leonid Kantorovich (1975), and Robert Solow (1987). The Shapley–Folkman–Starr results have been featured in the economics literature: in microeconomics, in general-equilibrium theory, in public economics (including market failures), as well as in game theory, in mathematical economics, and in applied mathematics (for economists). The Shapley–Folkman–Starr results have also influenced economics research using measure and integration theory.

=== Mathematical optimization ===
A function is convex if the region above its graph is a convex set.

The Shapley–Folkman lemma has been used to explain why large minimization problems with non-convexities can be nearly solved (with iterative methods whose convergence proofs are stated for only convex problems). The Shapley–Folkman lemma has encouraged the use of methods of convex minimization on other applications with sums of many functions.

==== Preliminaries of optimization theory ====
Nonlinear optimization relies on the following definitions for functions:

- The graph of a function f is the set of the pairs of arguments x and function evaluations f(x)

Graph(f) = { (x, f(x) ) }

- The epigraph of a real-valued function f is the set of points above the graph

The sine function is non-convex.

Epi(f) = { (x, u) : f(x) ≤ u }.

- A real-valued function is defined to be a convex function if its epigraph is a convex set.

For example, the quadratic function f(x) = x^{2} is convex, as is the absolute value function g(x) = |x|. However, the sine function (pictured) is non-convex on the interval (0, π).

==== Additive optimization problems ====
In many optimization problems, the objective function f is separable: that is, f is the sum of many summand-functions, each of which has its own argument:
$$f(x)=f\bigl((x_1,\dots,x_N)\bigr)=\sum f_n(x_n).$$

For example, problems of linear optimization are separable. Given a separable problem with an optimal solution, fix an optimal solution
$$x_{\min}=(x_1,\dots,x_N)_{\min}$$
with the minimum value $f(x_{\min})$. For this separable problem, consider an optimal solution $\bigl(x_{\min},f(x_{\min})\bigr)$ to the convexified problem, where convex hulls are taken of the graphs of the summand functions. Such an optimal solution is the limit of a sequence (Note: The limit of a sequence is a member of the closure of the original set, which is the smallest closed set that contains the original set. The Minkowski sum of two closed sets need not be closed, so the following inclusion (where $\operatorname{cl}$ denotes the topological closure operator) can be strict: $$\operatorname{cl}P+\operatorname{cl}Q\subseteq \operatorname{cl}(\operatorname{cl}P+\operatorname{cl}Q).$$ The inclusion can be strict even for two convex closed summand-sets. Ensuring that the Minkowski sum of sets be closed requires the closure operation, which appends limits of convergent sequences.) of points in the convexified problem
$$\bigl(x_j,f(x_j)\bigr)\in\sum\operatorname{conv} \operatorname{Graph}(f_n).$$
The given optimal-point is a sum of points in the graphs of the original summands and of a small number of convexified summands, by the Shapley–Folkman lemma.

This analysis was published by Ivar Ekeland in 1974 to explain the apparent convexity of separable problems with many summands, despite the non-convexity of the summand problems. In 1973, the young mathematician Claude Lemaréchal was surprised by his success with convex minimization methods on problems that were known to be non-convex; for minimizing nonlinear problems, a solution of the dual problem need not provide useful information for solving the primal problem, unless the primal problem be convex and satisfy a constraint qualification. Lemaréchal's problem was additively separable, and each summand function was non-convex; nonetheless, a solution to the dual problem provided a close approximation to the primal problem's optimal value. Ekeland's analysis explained the success of methods of convex minimization on large and separable problems, despite the non-convexities of the summand functions. Ekeland and later authors argued that additive separability produced an approximately convex aggregate problem, even though the summand functions were non-convex. The crucial step in these publications is the use of the Shapley–Folkman lemma. (Note: Aubin and Ekeland also considered the convex closure of a problem of non-convex minimization—that is, the problem defined as the closed convex hull of the epigraph of the original problem. Their study of duality gaps was extended by Di Guglielmo to the quasiconvex closure of a non-convex minimization problem—that is, the problem defined as the closed convex hull of the lower level sets.) The Shapley–Folkman lemma has encouraged the use of methods of convex minimization on other applications with sums of many functions.

=== Probability and measure theory ===
Convex sets are often studied with probability theory. Each point in the convex hull of a (non-empty) subset Q of a finite-dimensional space is the expected value of a simple random vector that takes its values in Q, as a consequence of Carathéodory's lemma. Thus, for a non-empty set Q, the collection of the expected values of the simple, Q-valued random vectors equals Q's convex hull; this equality implies that the Shapley–Folkman–Starr results are useful in probability theory. In the other direction, probability theory provides tools to examine convex sets generally and the Shapley–Folkman–Starr results specifically. The Shapley–Folkman–Starr results have been widely used in the probabilistic theory of random sets, for example, to prove a law of large numbers, a central limit theorem, and a large-deviations principle. These proofs of probabilistic limit theorems used the Shapley–Folkman–Starr results to avoid the assumption that all the random sets be convex.

A probability measure is a finite measure, and the Shapley–Folkman lemma has applications in non-probabilistic measure theory, such as the theories of volume and of vector measures. The Shapley–Folkman lemma enables a refinement of the Brunn–Minkowski inequality, which bounds the volume of sums in terms of the volumes of their summand-sets. The volume of a set is defined in terms of the Lebesgue measure, which is defined on subsets of Euclidean space. In advanced measure-theory, the Shapley–Folkman lemma has been used to prove Lyapunov's theorem, which states that the range of a vector measure is convex. Here, the traditional term "range" (alternatively, "image") is the set of values produced by the function. A vector measure is a vector-valued generalization of a measure; for example, if p_{1} and p_{2} are probability measures defined on the same measurable space, then the product function p_{1} p_{2} is a vector measure, where p_{1} p_{2} is defined for every event ω by

(p_{1} p_{2})(ω)=(p_{1}(ω), p_{2}(ω)).

Lyapunov's theorem has been used in economics, in ("bang-bang") control theory, and in statistical theory. Lyapunov's theorem has been called a continuous counterpart of the Shapley–Folkman lemma, which has itself been called a discrete analogue of Lyapunov's theorem.
