= Claude Lemaréchal =

French applied mathematician (born 1944)

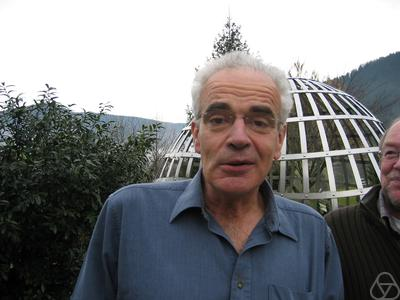
- Claude Lemaréchal in 2005
- Born: April 1944 (age 82); Paris, France
- Education: ENSEEIHT; INRIA
- Known for: Bundle methods of descent for convex minimization and nonsmooth optimization
- Awards: Dantzig Prize of SIAM and MPS 1994
- Scientific career
- Fields: Mathematical optimization Operations research Scientific computing
- Workplaces: INRIA

Claude Lemaréchal (born April 1944) is a French applied mathematician, and former senior researcher (directeur de recherche) at INRIA near Grenoble, France.

In mathematical optimization, Lemaréchal is known for his work in numerical methods for nonlinear optimization, especially for problems with nondifferentiable kinks. Lemaréchal and Philip Wolfe pioneered bundle methods of descent for convex minimization.

== Awards ==
In 1994, Lemaréchal and Roger J-B Wets were each awarded the George B. Dantzig Prize. Recognizing "original research that has had a major impact on the field of mathematical programming", the Dantzig Prize is awarded by the Society for Industrial and Applied Mathematics (SIAM) and the Mathematical Programming Society (MPS).

== Lagrangian duality and nonconvex primal problems ==
Soon after joining INRIA (then named "IRIA"), Lemaréchal had the assignment of helping a glass-manufacturer with a problem of scheduling its production, a problem whose first formulation required minimizing a non-convex function. For this non-convex minimization problem, Lemaréchal applied the theory of Lagrangian duality that was described in Lasdon's Optimization Theory for Large Systems. Because the primal problem was non-convex, there was no guarantee that a solution to the dual problem would provide useful information about the primal. Nonetheless, the dual problem did furnish useful information. Lemaréchal's success with Lagrangian dual methods on nonlinear programming problems with nonconvexities interested Ivar Ekeland and Jean–Pierre Aubin, who applied the Shapley–Folkman lemma to explain Lemaréchal's success. The Aubin–Ekeland analysis of duality gaps considered the convex closure of a nonconvex minimization problem — that is, the problem defined by the closed convex hull of the epigraph of the original problem. Following Ekeland and Aubin, similar applications of the Shapley–Folkman lemma are described in optimization monographs and textbooks. These developments were catalyzed by Lemaréchal's demonstration that Lagrangian-dual methods were useful on some optimization problems that lacked convexity.

== Bundle methods of descent ==
Lemaréchal's research also led to his work on (conjugate) subgradient methods and on bundle methods of descent for convex minimization problems.

== Bibliography ==
=== Biographical ===
- Aardal, Karen (March 1995). "Optima interview Claude Lemaréchal" (PDF). Optima: Mathematical Programming Society Newsletter: 2–4.
- Citation of Claude Lemaréchal for the George Dantzig Prize in 1994 in Optima, Issue 44 (1994) pages 4–5.

=== Scientific publications ===
- Bonnans, J. Frédéric; Gilbert, J. Charles; Lemaréchal, Claude; Sagastizábal, Claudia A. (2006). Numerical optimization: Theoretical and practical aspects. Universitext (Second revised ed. of translation of 1997 French ed.). Berlin: Springer-Verlag. pp. xiv+490. doi:10.1007/978-3-540-35447-5. ISBN 978-3-540-35445-1. MR 2265882.
- Hiriart-Urruty, Jean-Baptiste; Lemaréchal, Claude (2001). Fundamentals of convex analysis. Grundlehren Text Editions (Abridged revision of Convex analysis and minimization algorithms, Volumes I and II ed.). Berlin: Springer-Verlag. pp. x+259. ISBN 978-3-540-42205-1. MR 1865628.
  - Hiriart-Urruty, Jean-Baptiste; Lemaréchal, Claude (1993). Convex analysis and minimization algorithms, Volume I: Fundamentals. Grundlehren der Mathematischen Wissenschaften [Fundamental Principles of Mathematical Sciences]. Vol. 305. Berlin: Springer-Verlag. pp. xviii+417. ISBN 978-3-540-56850-6. MR 1261420.
  - Hiriart-Urruty, Jean-Baptiste; Lemaréchal, Claude (1993). Convex analysis and minimization algorithms, Volume II: Advanced theory and bundle methods. Grundlehren der Mathematischen Wissenschaften [Fundamental Principles of Mathematical Sciences]. Vol. 306. Berlin: Springer-Verlag. pp. xviii+346. ISBN 978-3-540-56852-0. MR 1295240.
- Lemaréchal, Claude (2001). "Lagrangian relaxation". In Michael Jünger and Denis Naddef (ed.). Computational combinatorial optimization: Papers from the Spring School held in Schloß Dagstuhl, May 15–19, 2000. Lecture Notes in Computer Science. Vol. 2241. Berlin: Springer-Verlag. pp. 112–156. doi:10.1007/3-540-45586-8_4. ISBN 978-3-540-42877-0. MR 1900016.
- Lemaréchal, Claude (1989). "Nondifferentiable optimization". In G. L. Nemhauser; A. H. G. Rinnooy Kan; M. J. Todd (eds.). Optimization. Handbooks in operations research and management science. Vol. 1. Amsterdam: North-Holland Publishing Co. pp. 529–572. doi:10.1016/S0927-0507(89)01008-X. ISBN 978-0-444-87284-5. MR 1105106.
