= Face (geometry) =

Planar surface that forms part of the boundary of a solid object

The face (red) of a cube (black)

In solid geometry, a face is a flat surface (a planar region) that forms part of the boundary of a solid object. For example, a cube has six faces in this sense.

In more modern treatments of the geometry of polyhedra and higher-dimensional polytopes, a "face" is defined in such a way that it may have any dimension. The vertices, edges, and (2-dimensional) faces of a polyhedron are all faces in this more general sense.

== Polygonal face ==
In elementary geometry, polyhedra are defined in various ways as shapes defined by systems of vertices (points), edges (line segments), and faces (polygons), that in many but not all of these definitions are required to form a surface that encloses a solid volume; the faces are the two-dimensional polygons of these definitions. (Note: Some other polygons, which are not faces, have also been considered for polyhedra and tilings. These include Petrie polygons, vertex figures and facets (flat polygons formed by coplanar vertices that do not lie in the same face of the polyhedron).) Other names for a polygonal face include polyhedron side and Euclidean plane tile.

For example, any of the six squares that bound a cube is a face of the cube. Sometimes "face" is also used to refer to the 2-dimensional features of a 4-polytope. With this meaning, the 4-dimensional tesseract has 24 square faces, each sharing two of 8 cubic cells.

Regular examples by Schläfli symbol
Polyhedron	Star polyhedron	Euclidean tiling	Hyperbolic tiling	4-polytope
{4,3}	{5/2,5}	{4,4}	{4,5}	{4,3,3}
The cube has 3 square faces per vertex.	The small stellated dodecahedron has 5 pentagrammic faces per vertex.	The square tiling in the Euclidean plane has 4 square faces per vertex.	The order-5 square tiling has 5 square faces per vertex.	The tesseract has 3 square faces per edge.

=== Number of polygonal faces of a polyhedron ===
Any convex polyhedron's surface has Euler characteristic

$$V - E + F = 2,$$

where V is the number of vertices, E is the number of edges, and F is the number of faces. This equation is known as Euler's polyhedron formula. Thus the number of faces is 2 more than the excess of the number of edges over the number of vertices. For example, a cube has 12 edges and 8 vertices, and hence 6 faces.

== k-face ==
In higher-dimensional geometry, the faces of a polytope are features of all dimensions. A face of dimension k is sometimes called a k-face. For example, the polygonal faces of an ordinary polyhedron are 2-faces. The word "face" is defined differently in different areas of mathematics. For example, many but not all authors allow the polytope itself and the empty set as faces of a polytope, where the empty set is for consistency given a "dimension" of −1. For any n-dimensional polytope, faces have dimension $k$ with $-1 \leq k \leq n$.

For example, with this meaning, the faces of a cube comprise the cube itself (a 3-face), its (square) facets (2-faces), its (line segment) edges (1-faces), its (point) vertices (0-faces), and the empty set.

In some areas of mathematics, such as polyhedral combinatorics, a polytope is by definition convex. In this setting, there is a precise definition: a face of a polytope P in Euclidean space $\mathbf{R}^n$ is the intersection of P with any closed halfspace whose boundary is disjoint from the relative interior of P. According to this definition, the set of faces of a polytope includes the polytope itself and the empty set. For convex polytopes, this definition is equivalent to the general definition of a face of a convex set, given below.

In other areas of mathematics, such as the theories of abstract polytopes and star polytopes, the requirement of convexity is relaxed. One precise combinatorial concept that generalizes some earlier types of polyhedra is the notion of a simplicial complex. More generally, there is the notion of a polytopal complex.

An n-dimensional simplex (line segment (n = 1), triangle (n = 2), tetrahedron (n = 3), etc.), defined by n + 1 vertices, has a face for each subset of the vertices, from the empty set up through the set of all vertices. In particular, there are 2^{n + 1} faces in total. The number of k-faces, for k ∈ {−1, 0, ..., n}, is the binomial coefficient $\binom{n+1}{k+1}$.

There are specific names for k-faces depending on the value of k and, in some cases, how close k is to the dimension n of the polytope.

=== Vertex or 0-face ===
Vertex is the common name for a 0-face.

=== Edge or 1-face ===
Edge is the common name for a 1-face.

=== Face or 2-face ===
The use of face in a context where a specific k is meant for a k-face but is not explicitly specified is commonly a 2-face.

=== Cell or 3-face ===
A cell is a polyhedral element (3-face) of a 4-dimensional polytope or 3-dimensional tessellation, or higher. Cells are facets for 4-polytopes and 3-honeycombs.

Examples:

Regular examples by Schläfli symbol
4-polytopes		3-honeycombs	
{4,3,3}	{5,3,3}	{4,3,4}	{5,3,4}
The tesseract has 3 cubic cells (3-faces) per edge.	The 120-cell has 3 dodecahedral cells (3-faces) per edge.	The cubic honeycomb fills Euclidean 3-space with cubes, with 4 cells (3-faces) per edge.	The order-4 dodecahedral honeycomb fills 3-dimensional hyperbolic space with dodecahedra, 4 cells (3-faces) per edge.

=== Facet or (n − 1)-face ===
In higher-dimensional geometry, the facets of a n-polytope are the (n − 1)-faces (faces of dimension one less than the polytope itself). A polytope is bounded by its facets.

For example:

- The facets of a line segment are its 0-faces or vertices.
- The facets of a polygon are its 1-faces or edges.
- The facets of a polyhedron or plane tiling are its 2-faces. However, in some contexts, a facet of a polyhedron means any polygon formed from a subset of three or more vertices of a 2-face.
- The facets of a 4D polytope or 3-honeycomb are its 3-faces or cells.
- The facets of a 5D polytope or 4-honeycomb are its 4-faces.

=== Ridge or (n − 2)-face ===
In related terminology, the (n − 2)-faces of an n-polytope are called ridges (also subfacets). A ridge is seen as the boundary between exactly two facets of a polytope or honeycomb.

For example:

- The ridges of a 2D polygon or 1D tiling are its 0-faces or vertices.
- The ridges of a 3D polyhedron or plane tiling are its 1-faces or edges.
- The ridges of a 4D polytope or 3-honeycomb are its 2-faces.
- The ridges of a 5D polytope or 4-honeycomb are its 3-faces or cells.

=== Peak or (n − 3)-face ===
The (n − 3)-faces of an n-polytope are called peaks. A peak contains a rotational axis of facets and ridges in a regular polytope or honeycomb.

For example:

- The peaks of a 3D polyhedron or plane tiling are its 0-faces or vertices.
- The peaks of a 4D polytope or 3-honeycomb are its 1-faces or edges.
- The peaks of a 5D polytope or 4-honeycomb are its 2-faces.

== Face of a convex set ==
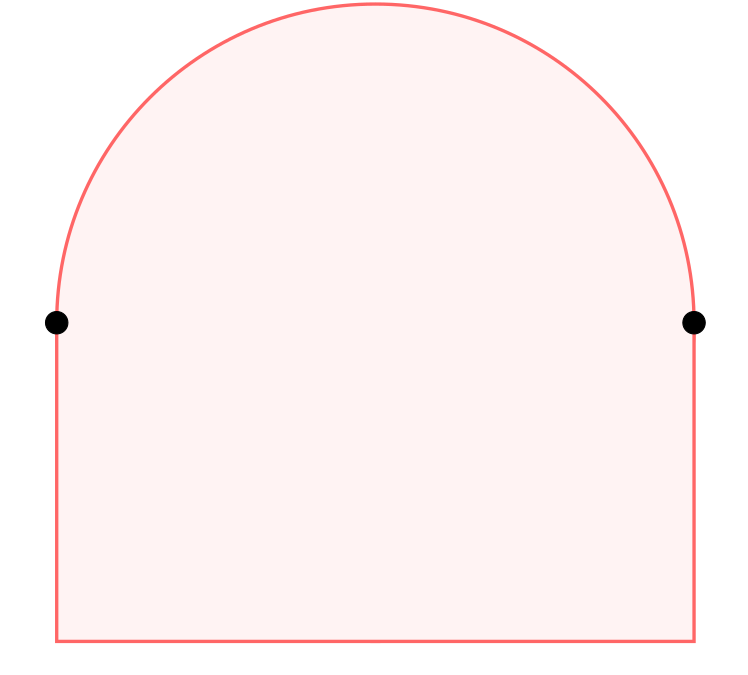
The two distinguished points are examples of extreme points of a convex set that are not exposed points. Therefore, not every face of a convex set is an exposed face.

The notion of a face can be generalized from convex polytopes to all convex sets, as follows. Let $C$ be a convex set in a real vector space $V$. A face or extreme set of $C$ is a convex subset $F\subseteq C$ such that whenever a point $p\in F$ lies strictly between two points $x$ and $y$ in $C$, both $x$ and $y$ must be in $F$. Equivalently, for any $x,y\in C$ and any real number $0<\theta<1$ such that $\theta x+(1-\theta)y$ is in $F$, $x$ and $y$ must be in $F$.

== See also ==
- Face lattice
- Polyhedral combinatorics
- Discrete geometry

== Bibliography ==
- Grünbaum, Branko (2003), Convex Polytopes, Graduate Texts in Mathematics, vol. 221 (2nd ed.), Springer, ISBN 0-387-00424-6, MR 1976856
- Matoušek, Jiří (2002), Lectures in Discrete Geometry, Graduate Texts in Mathematics, vol. 212, Springer, ISBN 9780387953748, MR 1899299
- Rockafellar, R. T. (1997) [1970]. Convex Analysis. Princeton, NJ: Princeton University Press. ISBN 1-4008-7317-7. MR 0274683.
- Ziegler, Günter M. (1995), Lectures on Polytopes, Graduate Texts in Mathematics, vol. 152, Springer, ISBN 9780387943657, MR 1311028
