= Extreme point (disambiguation) =

An extreme point, in mathematics, is a point in a convex set which does not lie in any open line segment joining two points in the set.

Extreme point or extremal point may also refer to:

- A point where some function attains its extremum
- A leaf vertex of a tree in graph theory
- Extreme points of Earth, points of land which extend further in one direction than any other part of that land
