= Naum Z. Shor =

Soviet and Ukrainian mathematician

Naum Zuselevich Shor
- Born: 1 January 1937; Kiev, Ukraine, USSR
- Died: 26 February 2006 (aged 69)
- Known for: Subgradient method
- Awards: Ukrainian State Prize for Science and Technology, USSR State Prize
- Scientific career
- Workplaces: Glushkov Institute of Cybernetics

Naum Zuselevich Shor (Russian: Наум Зуселевич Шор) (1 January 1937 – 26 February 2006) was a Soviet and Ukrainian mathematician specializing in optimization.

He made significant contributions to nonlinear and stochastic programming, numerical techniques for non-smooth optimization, discrete optimization problems, matrix optimization, dual quadratic bounds in multi-extremal programming problems.

Shor became a full member of the National Academy of Science of Ukraine in 1998.

== Subgradient methods ==
N. Z. Shor is well known for his method of generalized gradient descent with space dilation in the direction of the difference of two successive subgradients (the so-called r-algorithm), that was created in collaboration with Nikolay G. Zhurbenko. The ellipsoid method was re-invigorated by Arkadi S. Nemirovski and David B. Yudin, who developed a careful complexity analysis of its approximation properties for problems of convex minimization with real data. However, it was Leonid Khachiyan who provided the rational-arithmetic complexity analysis, using an ellipsoid algorithm, that established that linear programming problems can be solved in polynomial time.

It has long been known that the ellipsoidal methods are special cases of these subgradient-type methods.

== R-algorithm ==
Shor's r-algorithm is for unconstrained minimization of (possibly) non-smooth functions, which has been somewhat popular despite an unknown convergence rate. It can be viewed as a quasi-Newton method, although it does not satisfy the secant equation. Although the method involves subgradients, it is distinct from his so-called subgradient method described above.
