= Asplund space =

Mathematical Banach space

In mathematics — specifically, in functional analysis — an Asplund space or strong differentiability space is a type of well-behaved Banach space. Asplund spaces were introduced in 1968 by the mathematician Edgar Asplund, who was interested in the Fréchet differentiability properties of Lipschitz functions on Banach spaces.

== Equivalent definitions ==
There are many equivalent definitions of what it means for a Banach space X to be an Asplund space:

- X is Asplund if and only if every separable subspace Y of X has separable continuous dual space Y^{∗}.
- X is Asplund if and only if every continuous convex function on any open convex subset U of X is Fréchet differentiable at the points of a dense G_{δ}-subset of U.
- X is Asplund if and only if its dual space X^{∗} has the Radon–Nikodým property. This property was established by Namioka & Phelps in 1975 and Stegall in 1978.
- X is Asplund if and only if every non-empty bounded subset of its dual space X^{∗} has weak-∗-slices of arbitrarily small diameter.
- X is Asplund if and only if every non-empty weakly-∗ compact convex subset of the dual space X^{∗} is the weakly-∗ closed convex hull of its weakly-∗ strongly exposed points. In 1975, Huff & Morris showed that this property is equivalent to the statement that every bounded, closed and convex subset of the dual space X^{∗} is closed convex hull of its extreme points.

== Properties of Asplund spaces ==
- The class of Asplund spaces is closed under topological isomorphisms: that is, if X and Y are Banach spaces, X is Asplund, and X is homeomorphic to Y, then Y is also an Asplund space.
- Every closed linear subspace of an Asplund space is an Asplund space.
- Every quotient space of an Asplund space is an Asplund space.
- The class of Asplund spaces is closed under extensions: if X is a Banach space and Y is an Asplund subspace of X for which the quotient space X / Y is Asplund, then X is Asplund.
- Every locally Lipschitz function on an open subset of an Asplund space is Fréchet differentiable at the points of some dense subset of its domain. This result was established by Preiss in 1990 and has applications in optimization theory.
- The following theorem from Asplund's original 1968 paper is a good example of why non-Asplund spaces are badly behaved: if X is not an Asplund space, then there exists an equivalent norm on X that fails to be Fréchet differentiable at every point of X.
- In 1976, Ekeland & Lebourg showed that if X is a Banach space that has an equivalent norm that is Fréchet differentiable away from the origin, then X is an Asplund space. However, in 1990, Haydon gave an example of an Asplund space that does not have an equivalent norm that is Gateaux differentiable away from the origin.
