= Clarke generalized derivative =

Types generalized of derivatives

In mathematics, the Clarke generalized derivatives are generalized types of derivatives that allow for the differentiation of nonsmooth functions. The Clarke derivatives were introduced by Francis Clarke in 1975.

== Definitions ==
For a locally Lipschitz continuous function $f: \mathbb{R}^{n} \rightarrow \mathbb{R},$ the Clarke generalized directional derivative of $f$ at $x \in \mathbb{R}^n$ in the direction $v \in \mathbb{R}^n$ is defined as
$$f^{\circ} (x, v)= \limsup_{y \rightarrow x, h \downarrow 0}  \frac{f(y+ hv)-f(y)}{h},$$
where $\limsup$ denotes the limit supremum.

Then, using the above definition of $f^{\circ}$, the Clarke generalized gradient of $f$ at $x$ (also called the Clarke subdifferential) is given as
$$\partial^{\circ}\! f(x):=\{\xi \in \mathbb{R}^{n}: \langle\xi, v\rangle \leq f^{\circ}(x, v), \forall v \in \mathbb{R}^{n}\},$$
where $\langle \cdot, \cdot\rangle$ represents an inner product of vectors in $\mathbb{R}.$ Note that the Clarke generalized gradient is set-valued—that is, at each $x \in \mathbb{R}^n,$ the function value $\partial^{\circ}\! f(x)$ is a set.

More generally, given a Banach space $X$ and a subset $Y \subset X,$ the Clarke generalized directional derivative and generalized gradients are defined as above for a locally Lipschitz continuous function $f : Y \to \mathbb{R}.$

== See also ==
- Subgradient method — Class of optimization methods for nonsmooth functions.
- Subderivative
- Dini derivative
