= Oriented projective geometry =

Geometry

Oriented projective geometry is an oriented version of real projective geometry.

Whereas the real projective plane describes the set of all unoriented lines through the origin in R^{3}, the oriented projective plane describes lines with a given orientation. There are applications in computer graphics and computer vision where it is necessary to distinguish between rays light being emitted or absorbed by a point.

Elements in an oriented projective space are defined using signed homogeneous coordinates. Let $\mathbb{R}_{*}^n$ be the set of elements of $\mathbb{R}^n$ excluding the origin.

1. Oriented projective line, $\mathbb{T}^1$: $(x,w) \in \mathbb{R}^2_*$, with the equivalence relation $(x,w)\sim(a x,a w)\,$ for all $a>0$.
2. Oriented projective plane, $\mathbb{T}^2$: $(x,y,w) \in \mathbb{R}^3_*$, with $(x,y,w)\sim(a x,a y,a w)\,$ for all $a>0$.

These spaces can be viewed as extensions of euclidean space. $\mathbb{T}^1$ can be viewed as the union of two copies of $\mathbb{R}$, the sets (x,1) and (x,-1), plus two additional points at infinity, (1,0) and (-1,0). Likewise $\mathbb{T}^2$ can be viewed as two copies of $\mathbb{R}^2$, points of the form (x,y,1) and of (x,y,-1), plus one copy of $\mathbb{T}^1$, of the form (x,y,0).

An alternative way to view the spaces is as points on the circle or sphere, given by the points (x,y,w) with

x^{2}+y^{2}+w^{2}=1.

== Oriented real projective space ==
Let n be a nonnegative integer. The (analytical model of, or canonical) oriented (real) projective space or (canonical) two-sided projective space $\mathbb T^n$ is defined as

$\mathbb T^n=\{\{\lambda Z:\lambda\in\mathbb R_{>0}\}:Z\in\mathbb R^{n+1}\setminus\{0\}\}=\{\mathbb R_{>0}Z:Z\in\mathbb R^{n+1}\setminus\{0\}\}.$

Here, we use $\mathbb T$ to stand for two-sided.

=== Distance in oriented real projective space ===
The Euclidean distance between two points $p=(p_x,p_y,p_w)$ and $q=(q_x,q_y,q_w)$ in $\mathbb{T}^2$ can be defined as elements

$$(\sqrt{(p_x q_w-q_x p_w)^2+(p_y q_w-q_y p_w)^2},p_w q_w))$$

in $\mathbb{T}^1$.

The squared Euclidean distance is then:

$$((p_x q_w-q_x p_w)^2+(p_y q_w-q_y p_w)^2,\mathrm{sign}(p_w q_w)(p_w q_w)^2)$$

== Oriented complex projective geometry ==
Let n be a nonnegative integer. The oriented complex projective space ${\mathbb{CP}}^n_{S^1}$ is defined as

${\mathbb{CP}}^n_{S^1}=\{\{\lambda Z:\lambda\in\mathbb R_{>0}\}:Z\in\mathbb C^{n+1}\setminus\{0\}\}=\{\mathbb R_{>0}Z:Z\in\mathbb C^{n+1}\setminus\{0\}\}$. Here, we write $S^1$ to stand for the 1-sphere.

== See also ==
- Variational analysis
