= Claudia Sagastizábal =

Applied mathematician

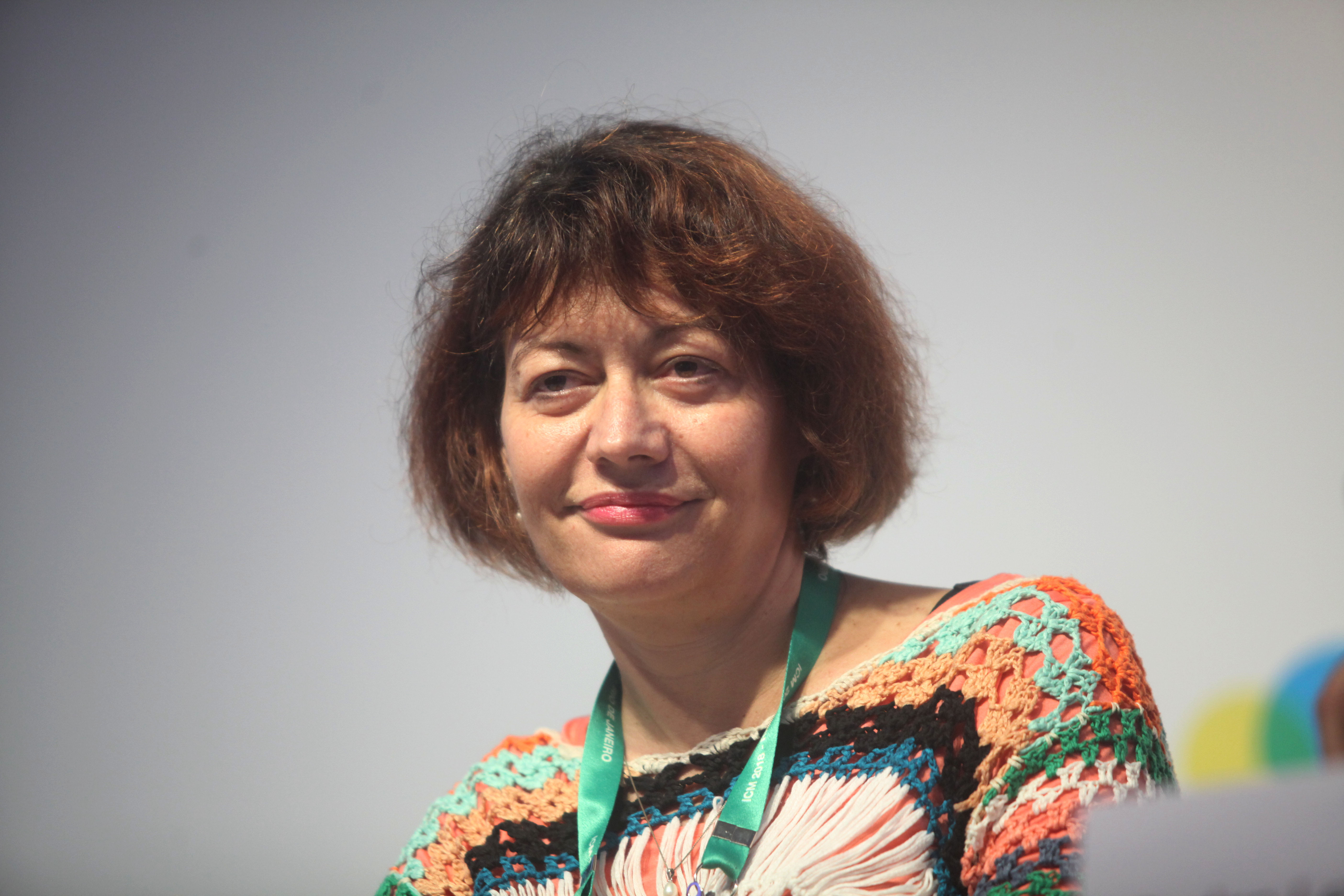
Sagastizábal at the ICM 2018

Claudia Alejandra Sagastizábal is an applied mathematician known for her research in convex optimization and energy management, and for her co-authorship of the book Numerical Optimization: Theoretical and Practical Aspects. She is a researcher at the University of Campinas in Brazil. Since 2015 she has been editor-in-chief of the journal Set-Valued and Variational Analysis.

== Education and career ==
Sagastizábal earned a degree in mathematics, astronomy and physics from the National University of Córdoba in Argentina in 1984. She completed a PhD in 1993 at Pantheon-Sorbonne University in France; her dissertation, Quelques methodes numeriques d'optimization: Application en gestion de stocks, was supervised by Claude Lemaréchal.

While in France, she worked with Électricité de France on optimization problems involving electricity generation, a topic that has continued in her research since that time. She moved to Brazil in 1997. Before joining the University of Campinas in 2017, she has also been affiliated with the Instituto Nacional de Matemática Pura e Aplicada and French Institute for Research in Computer Science and Automation, among other institutions.

== Recognition ==
Sagastizábal was an invited speaker at the 8th International Congress on Industrial and Applied Mathematics in 2015. She was also an invited speaker on control theory and mathematical optimization at the 2018 International Congress of Mathematicians.

She is a SIAM Fellow, in the 2024 class of fellows, elected "for contributions to non-smooth optimization and applications to engineering, and numerical methods for optimization".
