= Ross Starr =

American economist (born 1945)

Ross Marc Starr (born 1945) is an American economist who specializes in microeconomic theory, monetary economics and mathematical economics. He is a professor at the University of California, San Diego.

Starr grew up in Los Angeles where he attended high school. He attended UCLA and Reed College before obtaining his Bachelor of Science degree in mathematics from Stanford in 1966. He completed his PhD in economics at Stanford in 1972. His dissertation was supervised by Kenneth Arrow.

He has worked at the RAND corporation, Yale, UC Davis, UC Berkeley, the Federal Reserve Bank in San Francisco and at UC San Diego.

Starr first published the Shapley–Folkman lemma on the existence of quasi-equilibria in economies with non-convexities.

In addition to publications in economic journals, he wrote the textbook General Equilibrium Theory: An Introduction.

== Selected publications ==
- Starr, Ross M. (1969), "Quasi-equilibria in markets with non-convex preferences (Appendix 2: The Shapley–Folkman theorem, pp. 35–37)", Econometrica, 37 (1): 25–38, CiteSeerX 10.1.1.297.8498, doi:10.2307/1909201, JSTOR 1909201
- Starr, Ross M. (2008). "Shapley–Folkman theorem". In Durlauf, Steven N.; Blume, Lawrence E (eds.). The New Palgrave Dictionary of Economics (Second ed.). Palgrave Macmillan. pp. 317–318 (1st ed.). doi:10.1057/9780230226203.1518. ISBN 978-0-333-78676-5.
- Starr, Ross M., ed. (1989). General equilibrium models of monetary economies: Studies in the static foundations of monetary theory. Economic theory, econometrics, and mathematical economics. Academic Press. p. 351. ISBN 978-0-12-663970-4.
- Ross M. Starr (April 25, 2011). General Equilibrium Theory: An Introduction (2th ed.). Cambridge University Press. ISBN 978-1-139-49673-5.
