= Exposed point =

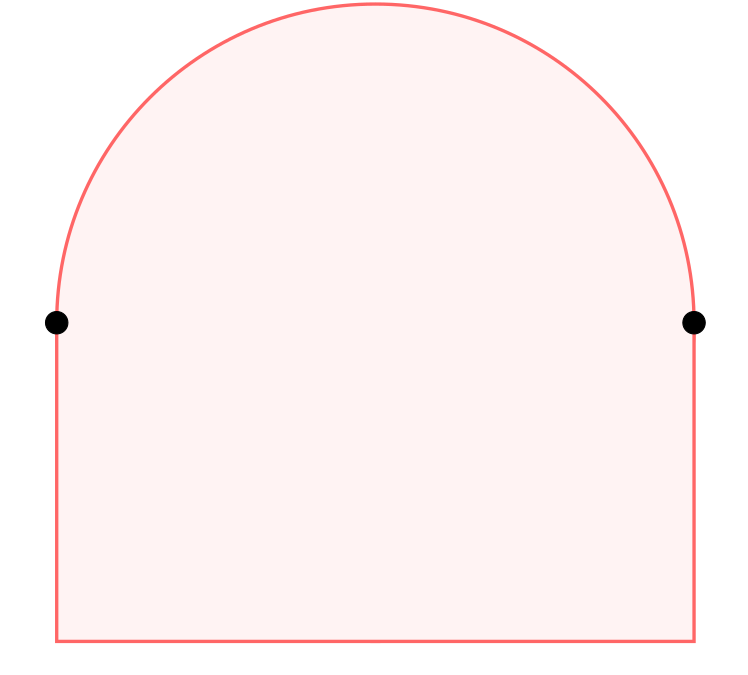
The two distinguished points are examples of extreme points of a convex set that are not exposed

In mathematics, an exposed point of a convex set $C$ is a point $x\in C$ at which some continuous linear functional attains its strict maximum over $C$. Such a functional is then said to expose $x$. There can be many exposing functionals for $x$. The set of exposed points of $C$ is usually denoted $\exp(C)$.

A stronger notion is that of strongly exposed point of $C$ which is an exposed point $x \in C$ such that some exposing functional $f$ of $x$ attains its strong maximum over $C$ at $x$, i.e. for each sequence $(x_n) \subset C$ we have the following implication: $f(x_n) \to \max f(C) \Longrightarrow \|x_n -x\| \to 0$. The set of all strongly exposed points of $C$ is usually denoted $\operatorname{str}\exp(C)$.

There are two weaker notions, that of extreme point and that of support point of $C$.

== See also ==
- Exposed face
