= Extreme point =

Point not between two other points

A convex set in light blue, and its extreme points in red

In mathematics, an extreme point of a convex set $S$ in a real or complex vector space or affine space is a point in $S$ that does not lie in any open line segment joining two points of $S.$ The extreme points of a line segment are called its endpoints. In linear programming problems, an extreme point is also called vertex or corner point of $S.$

== Definition ==
Throughout, it is assumed that $X$ is a real or complex vector space or affine space.

For any $p, x, y \in X,$ say that $p$ lies between $x$ and $y$ if $x \neq y$ and there exists a $0 < t < 1$ such that $p = t x + (1-t) y.$

If $K$ is a subset of $X$ and $p \in K,$ then $p$ is called an extreme point of $K$ if it does not lie between any two distinct points of $K.$ That is, if there does not exist $x, y \in K$ and $0 < t < 1$ such that $x \neq y$ and $p = t x + (1-t) y.$ The set of all extreme points of $K$ is denoted by $\operatorname{extreme}(K).$

Generalizations

If $S$ is a subset of a vector space then a linear sub-variety (that is, an affine subspace) $A$ of the vector space is called a support variety if $A$ meets $S$ (that is, $A \cap S$ is not empty) and every open segment $I \subseteq S$ whose interior meets $A$ is necessarily a subset of $A.$ A 0-dimensional support variety is called an extreme point of $S.$

=== Characterizations ===
The midpoint of two elements $x$ and $y$ in a vector space is the vector $\tfrac{1}{2}(x+y).$

For any elements $x$ and $y$ in a vector space, the set $[x, y] = \{t x + (1-t) y : 0 \leq t \leq 1\}$ is called the closed line segment or closed interval between $x$ and $y.$ The open line segment or open interval between $x$ and $y$ is $(x, x) = \varnothing$ when $x = y$ while it is $(x, y) = \{t x + (1-t) y : 0 < t < 1\}$ when $x \neq y.$ The points $x$ and $y$ are called the endpoints of these interval. An interval is said to be a non−degenerate interval or a proper interval if its endpoints are distinct. The midpoint of an interval is the midpoint of its endpoints.

The closed interval $[x, y]$ is equal to the convex hull of $(x, y)$ if (and only if) $x \neq y.$ So if $K$ is convex and $x, y \in K,$ then $[x, y] \subseteq K.$

If $K$ is a nonempty subset of $X$ and $F$ is a nonempty subset of $K,$ then $F$ is called a face of $K$ if whenever a point $p \in F$ lies between two points of $K,$ then those two points necessarily belong to $F.$

Theorem—Let $K$ be a non-empty convex subset of a vector space $X$ and let $p \in K.$ Then the following statements are equivalent:

1. $p$ is an extreme point of $K.$
2. $K \setminus \{p\}$ is convex.
3. $p$ is not the midpoint of a non-degenerate line segment contained in $K.$
4. for any $x, y \in K,$ if $p \in [x, y]$ then $x = p \text{ or } y = p.$
5. if $x \in X$ is such that both $p + x$ and $p - x$ belong to $K,$ then $x = 0.$
6. $\{p\}$ is a face of $K.$

== Examples ==
If $a < b$ are two real numbers then $a$ and $b$ are extreme points of the interval $[a, b].$ However, the open interval $(a, b)$ has no extreme points. Any open interval in $\R$ has no extreme points while any non-degenerate closed interval not equal to $\R$ does have extreme points (that is, the closed interval's endpoint(s)). More generally, any open subset of finite-dimensional Euclidean space $\R^n$ has no extreme points.

The extreme points of the closed unit disk in $\R^2$ is the unit circle.

The perimeter of any convex polygon in the plane is a face of that polygon. The vertices of any convex polygon in the plane $\R^2$ are the extreme points of that polygon.

An injective linear map $F : X \to Y$ sends the extreme points of a convex set $C \subseteq X$ to the extreme points of the convex set $F(X).$ This is also true for injective affine maps.

== Properties ==
The extreme points of a compact convex set form a Baire space (with the subspace topology) but this set may fail to be closed in $X.$

== Theorems ==
=== Krein–Milman theorem ===
The Krein–Milman theorem is arguably one of the most well-known theorems about extreme points.

Theorem—If $S$ is convex and compact in a locally convex topological vector space, then $S$ is the closed convex hull of its extreme points: In particular, such a set has extreme points.

=== For Banach spaces ===
These theorems are for Banach spaces with the Radon–Nikodym property.

A theorem of Joram Lindenstrauss states that, in a Banach space with the Radon–Nikodym property, a nonempty closed and bounded set has an extreme point. (In infinite-dimensional spaces, the property of compactness is stronger than the joint properties of being closed and being bounded.)

Theorem (Gerald Edgar)—Let $E$ be a Banach space with the Radon–Nikodym property, let $C$ be a separable, closed, bounded, convex subset of $E,$ and let $a$ be a point in $C.$ Then there is a probability measure $p$ on the universally measurable sets in $C$ such that $a$ is the barycenter of $p,$ and the set of extreme points of $C$ has $p$-measure 1.

Edgar’s theorem implies Lindenstrauss’s theorem.

== Related notions ==
A closed convex subset of a topological vector space is called strictly convex if every one of its (topological) boundary points is an extreme point. The unit ball of any Hilbert space is a strictly convex set.

=== k-extreme points ===
More generally, a point in a convex set $S$ is $k$-extreme if it lies in the interior of a $k$-dimensional convex set within $S,$ but not a $k + 1$-dimensional convex set within $S.$ Thus, an extreme point is also a $0$-extreme point. If $S$ is a polytope, then the $k$-extreme points are exactly the interior points of the $k$-dimensional faces of $S.$ More generally, for any convex set $S,$ the $k$-extreme points are partitioned into $k$-dimensional open faces.

The finite-dimensional Krein–Milman theorem, which is due to Minkowski, can be quickly proved using the concept of $k$-extreme points. If $S$ is closed, bounded, and $n$-dimensional, and if $p$ is a point in $S,$ then $p$ is $k$-extreme for some $k \leq n.$ The theorem asserts that $p$ is a convex combination of extreme points. If $k = 0$ then it is immediate. Otherwise $p$ lies on a line segment in $S$ which can be maximally extended (because $S$ is closed and bounded). If the endpoints of the segment are $q$ and $r,$ then their extreme rank must be less than that of $p,$ and the theorem follows by induction.

== See also ==
- Extreme set
- Exposed point
- Choquet theory – Area of functional analysis and convex analysis
- Bang–bang control

== Bibliography ==
- Adasch, Norbert; Ernst, Bruno; Keim, Dieter (1978). Topological Vector Spaces: The Theory Without Convexity Conditions. Lecture Notes in Mathematics. Vol. 639. Berlin New York: Springer-Verlag. ISBN 978-3-540-08662-8. OCLC 297140003.
- Bourbaki, Nicolas (1987) [1981]. Topological Vector Spaces: Chapters 1–5. Éléments de mathématique. Translated by Eggleston, H.G.; Madan, S. Berlin New York: Springer-Verlag. ISBN 3-540-13627-4. OCLC 17499190.
- Paul E. Black, ed. (2004-12-17). "extreme point". Dictionary of algorithms and data structures. US National institute of standards and technology.
- Borowski, Ephraim J.; Borwein, Jonathan M. (1989). "extreme point". Dictionary of mathematics. Collins dictionary. HarperCollins. ISBN 0-00-434347-6.
- Grothendieck, Alexander (1973). Topological Vector Spaces. Translated by Chaljub, Orlando. New York: Gordon and Breach Science Publishers. ISBN 978-0-677-30020-7. OCLC 886098.
- Halmos, Paul R. (8 November 1982). A Hilbert Space Problem Book. Graduate Texts in Mathematics. Vol. 19 (2nd ed.). New York: Springer-Verlag. ISBN 978-0-387-90685-0. OCLC 8169781.
- Jarchow, Hans (1981). Locally convex spaces. Stuttgart: B.G. Teubner. ISBN 978-3-519-02224-4. OCLC 8210342.
- Köthe, Gottfried (1983) [1969]. Topological Vector Spaces I. Grundlehren der mathematischen Wissenschaften. Vol. 159. Translated by Garling, D.J.H. New York: Springer Science & Business Media. ISBN 978-3-642-64988-2. MR 0248498. OCLC 840293704.
- Köthe, Gottfried (1979). Topological Vector Spaces II. Grundlehren der mathematischen Wissenschaften. Vol. 237. New York: Springer Science & Business Media. ISBN 978-0-387-90400-9. OCLC 180577972.
- Narici, Lawrence; Beckenstein, Edward (2011). Topological Vector Spaces. Pure and applied mathematics (Second ed.). Boca Raton, FL: CRC Press. ISBN 978-1584888666. OCLC 144216834.
- Robertson, Alex P.; Robertson, Wendy J. (1980). Topological Vector Spaces. Cambridge Tracts in Mathematics. Vol. 53. Cambridge England: Cambridge University Press. ISBN 978-0-521-29882-7. OCLC 589250.
- Rudin, Walter (1991). Functional Analysis. International Series in Pure and Applied Mathematics. Vol. 8 (Second ed.). New York, NY: McGraw-Hill Science/Engineering/Math. ISBN 978-0-07-054236-5. OCLC 21163277.
- Schaefer, Helmut H.; Wolff, Manfred P. (1999). Topological Vector Spaces. GTM. Vol. 8 (Second ed.). New York, NY: Springer New York Imprint Springer. ISBN 978-1-4612-7155-0. OCLC 840278135.
- Schechter, Eric (1996). Handbook of Analysis and Its Foundations. San Diego, CA: Academic Press. ISBN 978-0-12-622760-4. OCLC 175294365.
- Trèves, François (2006) [1967]. Topological Vector Spaces, Distributions and Kernels. Mineola, N.Y.: Dover Publications. ISBN 978-0-486-45352-1. OCLC 853623322.
- Wilansky, Albert (2013). Modern Methods in Topological Vector Spaces. Mineola, New York: Dover Publications, Inc. ISBN 978-0-486-49353-4. OCLC 849801114.
