= Roger J-B Wets =

Belgian and American mathematician (1937–2025)

- Born: February 1937; Uccle, Belgium
- Died: April 1, 2025 (aged 88)
- Education: Université libre de Bruxelles; University of California, Berkeley
- Awards: Frederick W. Lanchester Prize (1997)
- Scientific career
- Fields: stochastic programming
- Workplaces: Boeing; University of Chicago; University of Kentucky; University of California, Davis
- Thesis: Programming under uncertainty (1965)
- Doctoral advisor: George Dantzig; David Blackwell
- Website: www.math.ucdavis.edu/~rjbw/

Roger Jean-Baptiste Robert Wets (February 1937 – April 1, 2025) was a Belgian and American mathematician who is a pioneer in stochastic programming and variational analysis. He published as Roger J-B Wets. His research, expositions, graduate students, and his collaboration with R. Tyrrell Rockafellar have had a profound influence on optimization theory, computations, and applications. Since 2009, Wets has been a distinguished research professor at the mathematics department of the University of California, Davis.

== Education and career ==
Wets was born in Uccle, a suburb of Brussels, Belgium and attended high school there. He then worked for his family while earning his Licence in applied economics from Université de Bruxelles (Brussels, Belgium) in 1961. He was encouraged by Jacques H. Drèze to study optimization with George Dantzig at the program in operations research at the University of California, Berkeley. Dantzig and mathematician–statistician David Blackwell jointly supervised Wets's dissertation. In 1965 Wets befriended R. Tyrrell Rockafellar, whom Wets introduced to stochastic optimization, starting a collaboration of many decades.

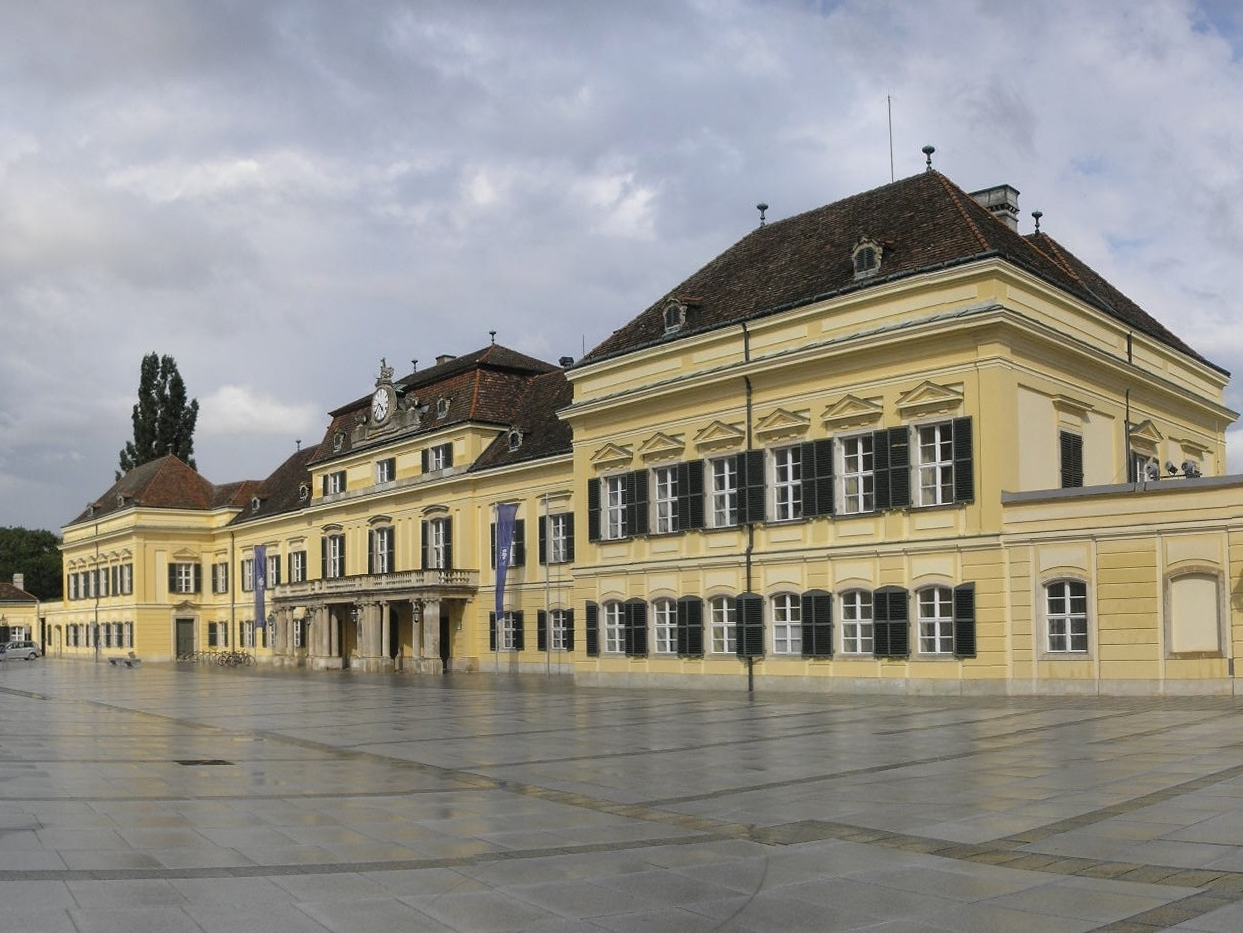
Wets helped to lead a project on decision-making under uncertainty at the International Institute for Applied Systems Analysis (pictured).

Wets worked at Boeing Scientific Research Labs between 1964 and 1970 and was Ford Professor at the University of Chicago from1970 to 1972 before being appointed Professor at the Mathematics Department of the University of Kentucky and then University Research Professor (1977–78). While at the International Institute for Applied Systems Analysis (IIASA) in Austria, during 1980–1984, he led research in decision-making in uncertainty, returning as an acting leader in 1985–1987; during that time, Wets and Rockafellar developed the progressive-hedging algorithm for stochastic programming. The University of California, Davis named him Professor (1984–1997), Distinguished Professor, and Distinguished Research Professor of Mathematics (2009–).

=== Awards and contributions ===
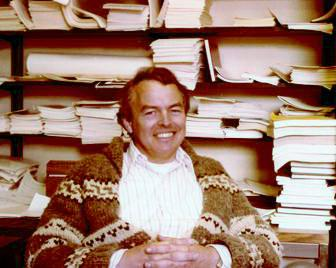
Since 1965 R. Tyrrell Rockafellar (pictured) and Wets have collaborated in stochastic programming, earning the Dantzig prize for their progressive-hedging algorithm and theory of epigraphic convergence.

Wets was awarded a George B. Dantzig Prize for "original research that has had a major impact on the field of mathematical programming" by the Society for Industrial and Applied Mathematics (SIAM) and the Mathematical Programming Society (MPS, now the Mathematical Optimization Society). In 1994, the Dantzig Prize was awarded to Wets and also to the French pioneer in nonsmooth computational-optimization, Claude Lemaréchal.

Wets's contributions included developing set-valued analysis, including metric spaces of sets, which he used to study the convergence of epigraphs; Wets's ideas of epigraphical convergence was used to study the convergence iterative methods of stochastic optimization and has had applications in the approximation theory of statistics. A metric theory of finite-dimensional epigraphical convergence ("cosmic convergence") appears in Variational analysis. Wets and his coauthor R. Tyrrell Rockafellar were awarded the 1997 Frederick W. Lanchester Prize by the Institute for Operations Research and the Management Sciences (INFORMS) for their monograph Variational Analysis, which was published in November 1997 and copyrighted in 1998.

With Rockafellar, Wets proposed, studied, and implemented the progressive-hedging algorithm for stochastic programming. Besides his theoretical and computational contributions, Wets has worked with applications on lake ecology (IIASA), finance (Frank Russel investment system), and developmental economics (World Bank). He also consulted with the development of professional stochastic-optimization software (IBM).

Wets died on 1 April, 2025, at the age of 88.

== See also ==
- Pompeiu–Hausdorff distance
