= Supporting hyperplane =

Hyperplane in geometry

A convex set $S$ (in pink), a supporting hyperplane of $S$ (the dashed line), and the supporting half-space delimited by the hyperplane which contains $S$ (in light blue).

In geometry, a supporting hyperplane of a set $S$ in Euclidean space $\mathbb R^n$ is a hyperplane that has both of the following two properties:

- $S$ is entirely contained in one of the two closed half-spaces bounded by the hyperplane,
- $S$ has at least one boundary-point on the hyperplane.

Here, a closed half-space is the half-space that includes the points within the hyperplane.

== Supporting hyperplane theorem ==
A convex set can have more than one supporting hyperplane at a given point on its boundary.

A supporting hyperplane containing a given point on the boundary of $S$ may not exist if $S$ is not convex.

This theorem states that if $S$ is a convex set in the topological vector space $X=\mathbb{R}^n,$ and $x_0$ is a point on the boundary of $S,$ then there exists a supporting hyperplane containing $x_0.$ If $x^* \in X^* \backslash \{0\}$ ($X^*$ is the dual space of $X$, $x^*$ is a nonzero linear functional) such that $x^*\left(x_0\right) \geq x^*(x)$ for all $x \in S$, then

$$H = \{x \in X: x^*(x) = x^*\left(x_0\right)\}$$

defines a supporting hyperplane.

Conversely, if $S$ is a closed set with nonempty interior such that every point on the boundary has a supporting hyperplane, then $S$ is a convex set, and is the intersection of all its supporting closed half-spaces.

The hyperplane in the theorem may not be unique, as noticed in the second picture on the right. If the closed set $S$ is not convex, the statement of the theorem is not true at all points on the boundary of $S,$ as illustrated in the third picture on the right.

The supporting hyperplanes of convex sets are also called tac-planes or tac-hyperplanes.

The forward direction can be proved as a special case of the separating hyperplane theorem (see the page for the proof). For the converse direction,

Proof

Define $T$ to be the intersection of all its supporting closed half-spaces. Clearly $S \subset T$. Now let $y\not \in S$, show $y \not\in T$.

Let $x\in \mathrm{int}(S)$, and consider the line segment $[x, y]$. Let $t$ be the largest number such that $[x, t(y-x) + x]$ is contained in $S$. Then $t\in (0, 1)$.

Let $b = t(y-x) + x$, then $b\in \partial S$. Draw a supporting hyperplane across $b$. Let it be represented as a nonzero linear functional $f: \R^n \to \R$ such that $\forall a\in T, f(a) \geq f(b)$. Then since $x\in \mathrm{int}(S)$, we have $f(x) > f(b)$. Thus by $\frac{f(y) - f(b)}{1-t} = \frac{f(b) - f(x)}{t-0} < 0$, we have $f(y) < f(b)$, so $y \not\in T$.

== See also ==
- Exposed face, the intersection of a set with a supporting hyperplane of it
- Support function
- Supporting line (supporting hyperplanes in $\mathbb{R}^2$)

== References & further reading ==
- Ostaszewski, Adam (1990). Advanced mathematical methods, London School of Economics Mathematics Series. Cambridge; New York: Cambridge University Press. p. 129. ISBN 0-521-28964-5.
- Giaquinta, Mariano; Hildebrandt, Stefan (1996). Calculus of variations. Berlin; New York: Springer. p. 57. ISBN 3-540-50625-X.
- Goh, C. J.; Yang, X.Q. (2002). Duality in optimization and variational inequalities. London; New York: Taylor & Francis. p. 13. ISBN 0-415-27479-6.
- Soltan, V. (2021). Support and separation properties of convex sets in finite dimension. Extracta Math. Vol. 36, no. 2, 241-278.
