= R. Tyrrell Rockafellar =

American mathematician (born 1935)

Ralph Tyrrell Rockafellar
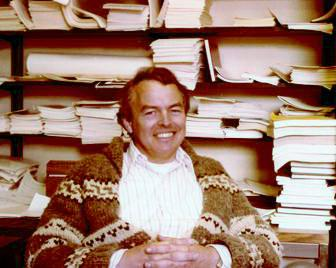
- R. Tyrrell ("Terry") Rockafellar in 1977
- Born: February 10, 1935 (age 91); Milwaukee, Wisconsin, U.S.
- Education: Harvard University; Marquette University
- Known for: Convex analysis Monotone operator Calculus of variations Stochastic programming Oriented matroid
- Awards: Dantzig Prize of SIAM and MPS 1982 von Neumann citation of SIAM 1992; Frederick W. Lanchester Prize of INFORMS 1998; John von Neumann Theory Prize of INFORMS 1999; Doctor Honoris Causa: Groningen, Montpellier, Chile, Alicante
- Scientific career
- Fields: Mathematical optimization
- Workplaces: University of Washington 1966- University of Florida (adjunct) 2003- University of Texas, Austin 1963–1965
- Thesis: Convex Functions and Dual Extremum Problems (1963)
- Doctoral advisor: Garrett Birkhoff
- Notable students: Peter Wolenski; Francis Clarke

Ralph Tyrrell "Terry" Rockafellar (born February 10, 1935) is an American mathematician and one of the leading scholars in optimization theory and related fields of analysis and combinatorics. He is the author of four major books including the landmark text "Convex Analysis" (1970), which has been cited more than 27,000 times according to Google Scholar and remains the standard reference on the subject, and "Variational Analysis" (1998, with Roger J-B Wets) for which the authors received the Frederick W. Lanchester Prize from the Institute for Operations Research and the Management Sciences (INFORMS).

He is professor emeritus at the departments of mathematics and applied mathematics at the University of Washington, Seattle.

== Early life and education ==
Ralph Tyrrell Rockafellar was born in Milwaukee, Wisconsin. He is named after his father Ralph Rockafellar, with Tyrrell being his mother's maiden name. Since his mother was fond of the name Terry, the parents adopted it as a nickname for Tyrrell and soon everybody referred to him as Terry.

Rockafellar is a distant relative of the American business magnate and philanthropist John D. Rockefeller. They both can trace their ancestors back to two brothers named Rockenfelder that came to America from the Rhineland-Pfaltz region of Germany in 1728. Soon the spelling of the family name evolved, resulting in Rockafellar, Rockefeller, and many other versions of the name.

Rockafellar moved to Cambridge, Massachusetts to attend Harvard College in 1953. Majoring in mathematics, he graduated from Harvard in 1957 with summa cum laude. He was also elected for the Phi Beta Kappa honor society. Rockafellar was a Fulbright Scholar at the University of Bonn in 1957–58 and completed a Master of Science degree at Marquette University in 1959. Formally under the guidance of Professor Garrett Birkhoff, Rockafellar completed his Doctor of Philosophy degree in mathematics from Harvard University in 1963 with the dissertation "Convex Functions and Dual Extremum Problems." However, at the time there was little interest in convexity and optimization at Harvard and Birkhoff was neither involved with the research nor familiar with the subject. The dissertation was inspired by the duality theory of linear programming developed by John von Neumann, which Rockafellar learned about through volumes of recent papers compiled by Albert W. Tucker at Princeton University. Rockafellar's dissertation together with the contemporary work by Jean-Jacques Moreau in France are regarded as the birth of convex analysis.

== Career ==
After graduating from Harvard, Rockafellar became Assistant Professor of Mathematics at the University of Texas, Austin, where he also was affiliated with the Department of Computer Science. After two years, he moved to University of Washington in Seattle where he filled joint positions in the Departments of Mathematics and Applied Mathematics from 1966 to 2003 when he retired. He is presently Professor Emeritus at the university. He has held adjunct positions at the University of Florida and Hong Kong Polytechnic University.

Rockafellar was a visiting professor at the Mathematics Institute, Copenhagen (1964), Princeton University (1965–66), University of Grenoble (1973–74), University of Colorado, Boulder (1978), International Institute of Applied Systems Analysis, Vienna (1980–81), University of Pisa (1991), Paris Dauphine University (1996), University of Pau (1997), Keio University (2009), National University of Singapore (2011), University of Vienna (2011), and Yale University (2012).

Rockafellar received the Dantzig Prize from the Society for Industrial and Applied Mathematics (SIAM) and the Mathematical Optimization Society in 1982, delivered the 1992 John von Neumann Lecture, received with Roger J-B Wets the Frederick W. Lanchester Prize from the Institute for Operations Research and the Management Sciences (INFORMS) in 1998 for the book "Variational Analysis." In 1999, he was awarded the John von Neumann Theory Prize from INFORMS. He was elected to the 2002 class of Fellows of INFORMS. He is the recipient of honorary doctoral degrees from University of Groningen (1984), University of Montpellier (1995), University of Chile (1998), and University of Alicante (2000). The Institute for Scientific Information (ISI) lists Rockafellar as a highly cited researcher.

== Research ==
Rockafellar's research is motivated by the goal of organizing mathematical ideas and concepts into robust frameworks that yield new insights and relations. This approach is most salient in his seminal book "Variational Analysis" (1998, with Roger J-B Wets), where numerous threads developed in the areas of convex analysis, nonlinear analysis, calculus of variation, mathematical optimization, equilibrium theory, and control systems were brought together to produce a unified approach to variational problems in finite dimensions. These various fields of study are now referred to as variational analysis. In particular, the text dispenses of differentiability as a necessary property in many areas of analysis and embraces nonsmoothness, set-valuedness, and extended real-valuedness, while still developing far-reaching calculus rules.

=== Contributions to Mathematics ===
The approach of extending the real line with the values infinity and negative infinity and then allowing (convex) functions to take these values can be traced back to Rockafellar's dissertation and, independently, the work by Jean-Jacques Moreau around the same time. The central role of set-valued mappings (also called multivalued functions) was also recognized in Rockafellar's dissertation and, in fact, the standard notation ∂f(x) for the set of subgradients of a function f at x originated there.

Rockafellar contributed to nonsmooth analysis by extending the rule of Fermat, which characterizes solutions of optimization problems, to composite problems using subgradient calculus and variational geometry and thereby bypassing the implicit function theorem. The approach broadens the notion of Lagrange multipliers to settings beyond smooth equality and inequality systems. In his doctoral dissertation and numerous later publications, Rockafellar developed a general duality theory based on convex conjugate functions that centers on embedding a problem within a family of problems obtained by a perturbation of parameters. This encapsulates linear programming duality and Lagrangian duality, and extends to general convex problems as well as nonconvex ones, especially when combined with an augmentation.

=== Contributions to Applications ===
Rockafellar also worked on applied problems and computational aspects. In the 1970s, he contributed to the development of the proximal point method, which underpins several successful algorithms including the proximal gradient method often used in statistical applications. He placed the analysis of expectation functions in stochastic programming on solid footing by defining and analyzing normal integrands. Rockafellar also contributed to the analysis of control systems and general equilibrium theory in economics.

Since the late 1990s, Rockafellar has been actively involved with organizing and expanding the mathematical concepts for risk assessment and decision making in financial engineering and reliability engineering. This includes examining the mathematical properties of risk measures and coining the terms "conditional value-at-risk", in 2000 as well as "superquantile" and "buffered failure probability" in 2010, which either coincide with or are closely related to expected shortfall.

== Selected publications ==
=== Books ===
- Rockafellar, R. T. (1997). Convex analysis. Princeton landmarks in mathematics (Reprint of the 1970 Princeton mathematical series 28 ed.). Princeton, NJ: Princeton University Press. pp. xviii+451. ISBN 978-0-691-01586-6. MR 1451876.
- Rockafellar, R. T. (1974). Conjugate duality and optimization. Lectures given at the Johns Hopkins University, Baltimore, Md., June, 1973. Conference Board of the Mathematical Sciences Regional Conference Series in Applied Mathematics, No. 16. Society for Industrial and Applied Mathematics, Philadelphia, Pa. vi+74 pp.
- Rockafellar, R. T. (1981). The theory of subgradients and its applications to problems of optimization. Convex and nonconvex functions. Heldermann Verlag, Berlin. vii+107 pp. ISBN 3-88538-201-6
- Rockafellar, R. T. (1984). Network Flows and Monotropic Optimization. Wiley.
- Rockafellar, R. T.; Wets, Roger J-B (2005) [1998]. Variational analysis. Grundlehren der mathematischen Wissenschaften (Fundamental Principles of Mathematical Sciences). Vol. 317 (third corrected printing ed.). Berlin: Springer-Verlag. pp. xiv+733. doi:10.1007/978-3-642-02431-3. ISBN 978-3-540-62772-2. MR 1491362.
- Dontchev, A. L.; Rockafellar, R. T. (2009). Implicit functions and solution mappings. A view from variational analysis. Springer Monographs in Mathematics. Springer, Dordrecht. xii+375 pp. ISBN 978-0-387-87820-1.

=== Papers ===
- Rockafellar, R. T. (1967). Monotone processes of convex and concave type. Memoirs of the American Mathematical Society, No. 77 American Mathematical Society, Providence, R.I. i+74 pp.
- Rockafellar, R. T. (1969). "The Elementary Vectors of a Subspace of $R^N$ (1967)" (PDF). In R. C. Bose and T. A. Dowling (ed.). Combinatorial Mathematics and its Applications. The University of North Carolina Monograph Series in Probability and Statistics. Chapel Hill, North Carolina: University of North Carolina Press. pp. 104–127. MR 0278972. Archived from the original (PDF) on 2011-09-27.
- Rockafellar, R. T. (1970). "On the maximal monotonicity of subdifferential mappings". Pacific J. Math. 33: 209–216. doi:10.2140/pjm.1970.33.209.
- Rockafellar, R. T. (1973). "The multiplier method of Hestenes and Powell applied to convex programming". J. Optimization Theory Appl. 12 (6): 555–562. doi:10.1007/bf00934777. S2CID 121931445.
- Rockafellar, R. T. (1974). "Augmented Lagrange multiplier functions and duality in nonconvex programming". SIAM J. Control. 12 (2): 268–285. doi:10.1137/0312021.
- Rockafellar, R. T. (1976). "Augmented Lagrangians and applications of the proximal point algorithm in convex programming". Mathematics of Operations Research. 1 (2): 97–116. CiteSeerX 10.1.1.298.6206. doi:10.1287/moor.1.2.97.
- Rockafellar, R. T. (1993). "Lagrange multipliers and optimality". SIAM Rev. 35 (2): 183–238. doi:10.1137/1035044. (1992 John von Neumann Lecture)
- Rockafellar, R. T.; Wets, Roger J.-B. (1991). "Scenarios and policy aggregation in optimization under uncertainty" (PDF). Mathematics of Operations Research. 16 (1): 119–147. doi:10.1287/moor.16.1.119. S2CID 32457406.
- Rockafellar, R. T.; Uryasev, S. (2000). "Optimization of conditional value-at-risk". Journal of Risk. 2 (3): 493–517. doi:10.21314/JOR.2000.038. S2CID 854622.
- Rockafellar, R. T.; Uryasev, S.; Zabarankin, M. (2006). "Generalized deviations in risk analysis". Finance and Stochastics. 10: 51–74. doi:10.1007/s00780-005-0165-8. S2CID 12632322.
- Rockafellar, R. T.; Royset, J. O. (2010). "On buffered failure probability in design and optimization of structures". Reliability Engineering and System Safety. 95 (5): 499–510. doi:10.1016/j.ress.2010.01.001. hdl:10945/35303. S2CID 1653873.
- Rockafellar, R. T.; Uryasev, S. (2013). "The fundamental risk quadrangle in risk management, optimization and statistical estimation". Surveys in Operations Research and Management Science. 18 (1–2): 33–53. doi:10.1016/j.sorms.2013.03.001.

== See also ==
- Convex analysis (cf. Werner Fenchel)
  - Convex function
    - Characteristic function (convex analysis)
    - Closed convex function
    - Convex conjugate
    - Epigraph (mathematics)
    - Fenchel conjugate
    - Legendre–Fenchel transformation
    - Proper convex function
    - Subdifferential
    - Subgradient
  - Convex set
    - Carathéodory's theorem
    - Convex cone
- Duality (mathematics)
- Monotone operator (Cyclic decomposition of maximal monotone operator)
- Oriented matroids (realizable OMs and applications)
  - Carathéodory's theorem (convex hull)
  - Lemma of Farkas
  - Monotropic programming
  - Tucker, Albert W.
- Set-valued analysis
  - Pompeiu–Hausdorff distance
  - Mordukhovich, Boris
- Stochastic programming
- Variational analysis and Control theory
  - Epigraph (mathematics)
- Wets, Roger J-B
