= Francis Clarke (mathematician) =

Canadian and French mathematician

Frank "Francis" Herbert Clarke (born 30 July 1948, in Montreal) is a Canadian and French mathematician.

== Biography ==
Francis Clarke graduated in 1969 from McGill University with a B.Sc. degree in 1969 and in 1973 from the University of Washington with a Ph.D. with thesis advisor R. Tyrrell Rockafellar. In 1978 Clarke became a full professor at the University of British Columbia and gave an invited lecture at the International Congress of Mathematicians (ICM) in Helsinki. In 1984 he was appointed director of the Centre de Recherches Mathématiques (CRM) of the University of Montreal. During the nine years of his directorship, CRM became Canada's leading national research center for mathematics and its applications. The successes of Clarke's directorship included the creation of workshops and postdoctoral fellowships, thematic years, two series of publications, research awards, and an endowment fund. Clarke is also the founding director of the Institut des Sciences Mathématiques (ISM) of Quebec.

In 1995 Clarke was appointed full professor at Claude Bernard University Lyon 1, where he was a member of the Institut Camille-Jordan. In 2000 he was appointed to a chair in mathematical theory of control at the Institut universitaire de France. In 2004, he chaired the selection committee for the first joint conference of the six mathematical societies of Canada and France.

== Research ==
Clarke is known for his contributions to nonsmooth analysis (a term that is due to him), and particularly for his theory of generalized gradients (gradients généralisés), as well as for his work in optimization, differential equations, control theory, calculus of variations, and modeling in several application domains. His book Optimization and Nonsmooth Analysis has over 11600 citations.

== Awards and honours ==
- W. T. and Idalia Reid Prize, Society for Industrial and Applied Mathematics [2015]
- Senior Member, Institut universitaire de France (chair in Control Theory), 2000.
- Prix Urgel-Archambault, Association francophone pour le savoir (ACFAS), 1990.
- Coxeter-James Prize, Canadian Mathematical Society, 1980
- Killam Fellowship (Bourse de recherché Killam) 1978–80, Council of Canada
- Fellow of the Royal Society of Canada, 1979.

== Books ==
- Optimization and Nonsmooth Analysis, Wiley, 1983 (Russian translation 1984). Reissue: SIAM Classics in Applied Mathematics, Vol. 5 (1990).
- Methods of Dynamic and Nonsmooth Optimization, SIAM, 1989.
- Nonsmooth Analysis and Control Theory (with Yu. Ledyaev, R. J. Stern and P. R. Wolenski), Graduate Texts in Mathematics 178, Springer-Verlag, 1998; 2008 pbk edition
- Functional Analysis, Calculus of Variations and Optimal Control, Graduate Texts in Mathematics 264, Springer, 2013.
