= Fractional programming =

In mathematical optimization, fractional programming is a generalization of linear-fractional programming. The objective function in a fractional program is a ratio of two functions that are in general nonlinear. The ratio to be optimized often describes some kind of efficiency of a system.

== Definition ==
Let $f, g, h_j, j=1, \ldots, m$ be real-valued functions defined on a set $\mathbf{S}_0 \subset \mathbb{R}^n$. Let $\mathbf{S} = \{\boldsymbol{x} \in \mathbf{S}_0: h_j(\boldsymbol{x}) \leq 0, j=1, \ldots, m\}$. The nonlinear program

$$\underset{\boldsymbol{x} \in \mathbf{S}}{\text{maximize}} \quad \frac{f(\boldsymbol{x})}{g(\boldsymbol{x})},$$

where $g(\boldsymbol{x}) > 0$ on $\mathbf{S}$, is called a fractional program.

== Concave fractional programs ==
A fractional program in which f is nonnegative and concave, g is positive and convex, and S is a convex set is called a concave fractional program. If g is affine, f does not have to be restricted in sign. The linear fractional program is a special case of a concave fractional program where all functions $f, g, h_j, j=1, \ldots, m$ are affine.

=== Properties ===
The function $q(\boldsymbol{x}) = f(\boldsymbol{x}) / g(\boldsymbol{x})$ is semistrictly quasiconcave on S. If f and g are differentiable, then q is pseudoconcave. In a linear fractional program, the objective function is pseudolinear.

=== Transformation to a concave program ===
By the transformation $\boldsymbol{y} = \frac{\boldsymbol{x}}{g(\boldsymbol{x})}; t = \frac{1}{g(\boldsymbol{x})}$, any concave fractional program can be transformed to the equivalent parameter-free concave program

$$\begin{align}
\underset{\frac{\boldsymbol{y}}{t} \in \mathbf{S}_0}{\text{maximize}} \quad & t f\left(\frac{\boldsymbol{y}}{t}\right) \\
\text{subject to} \quad & t g\left(\frac{\boldsymbol{y}}{t}\right) \leq 1, \\
& t \geq 0.
\end{align}$$

If g is affine, the first constraint is changed to $t g(\frac{\boldsymbol{y}}{t}) = 1$ and the assumption that g is positive may be dropped. Also, it simplifies to $g(\boldsymbol{y}) = 1$.

=== Duality ===
The Lagrangian dual of the equivalent concave program is

$$\begin{align}
\underset{\boldsymbol{u}}{\text{minimize}} \quad & \underset{\boldsymbol{x} \in \mathbf{S}_0}{\operatorname{sup}} \frac{f(\boldsymbol{x}) - \boldsymbol{u}^T \boldsymbol{h}(\boldsymbol{x})}{g(\boldsymbol{x})} \\
\text{subject to} \quad & u_i \geq 0, \quad i = 1,\dots,m.
\end{align}$$
