= Nonlinear expectation =

In probability theory, a nonlinear expectation is a nonlinear generalization of the expectation. Nonlinear expectations are useful in utility theory as they more closely match human behavior than traditional expectations. The common use of nonlinear expectations is in assessing risks under uncertainty. Generally, nonlinear expectations are categorized into sub-linear and super-linear expectations dependent on the additive properties of the given sets. Much of the study of nonlinear expectation is attributed to work of mathematicians within the past two decades.

== Definition ==
A functional $\mathbb{E}: \mathcal{H} \to \mathbb{R}$ (where $\mathcal{H}$ is a vector lattice on a given set $\Omega$) is a nonlinear expectation if it satisfies:

1. Monotonicity: if $X,Y \in \mathcal{H}$ such that $X \geq Y$ then $\mathbb{E}[X] \geq \mathbb{E}[Y]$
2. Preserving of constants: if $c \in \mathbb{R}$ then $\mathbb{E}[c] = c$

The complete consideration of the given set, the linear space for the functions given that set, and the nonlinear expectation value is called the nonlinear expectation space.

Often other properties are also desirable, for instance convexity, subadditivity, positive homogeneity, and translative of constants. For a nonlinear expectation to be further classified as a sublinear expectation, the following two conditions must also be met:

1. Subadditivity: for $X,Y \in \mathcal{H}$ then $\mathbb{E}[X] + \mathbb{E}[Y] \geq \mathbb{E}[X+Y]$
2. Positive homogeneity: for $\lambda\geq0$ then $\mathbb{E}[\lambda X] = \lambda \mathbb{E}[X]$

For a nonlinear expectation to instead be classified as a superlinear expectation, the subadditivity condition above is instead replaced by the condition:

1. Superadditivity: for $X,Y \in \mathcal{H}$ then $\mathbb{E}[X] + \mathbb{E}[Y] \leq \mathbb{E}[X+Y]$

== Examples ==
- Choquet expectation: a subadditive or superadditive integral that is used in image processing and behavioral decision theory.
- g-expectation via nonlinear BSDE's: frequently used to model financial drift uncertainty.
- If $\rho$ is a risk measure then $\mathbb{E}[X] := \rho(-X)$ defines a nonlinear expectation.
- Markov Chains: for the prediction of events undergoing model uncertainties.
