= Contour set =

In mathematics, contour sets generalize and formalize the everyday notions of

- everything superior to something
- everything superior or equivalent to something
- everything inferior to something
- everything inferior or equivalent to something.

== Formal definitions ==
Given a relation on pairs of elements of set $X$

$$\succcurlyeq~\subseteq~X^2$$

and an element $x$ of $X$

$$x\in X$$

The upper contour set of $x$ is the set of all $y$ that are related to $x$:

$$\left\{ y~\backepsilon~y\succcurlyeq x\right\}$$

The lower contour set of $x$ is the set of all $y$ such that $x$ is related to them:

$$\left\{ y~\backepsilon~x\succcurlyeq y\right\}$$

The strict upper contour set of $x$ is the set of all $y$ that are related to $x$ without $x$ being in this way related to any of them:

$$\left\{ y~\backepsilon~(y\succcurlyeq x)\land\lnot(x\succcurlyeq y)\right\}$$

The strict lower contour set of $x$ is the set of all $y$ such that $x$ is related to them without any of them being in this way related to $x$:

$$\left\{ y~\backepsilon~(x\succcurlyeq y)\land\lnot(y\succcurlyeq x)\right\}$$

The formal expressions of the last two may be simplified if we have defined

$$\succ~=~\left\{ \left(a,b\right)~\backepsilon~\left(a\succcurlyeq b\right)\land\lnot(b\succcurlyeq a)\right\}$$

so that $a$ is related to $b$ but $b$ is not related to $a$, in which case the strict upper contour set of $x$ is

$$\left\{ y~\backepsilon~y\succ x\right\}$$

and the strict lower contour set of $x$ is

$$\left\{ y~\backepsilon~x\succ y\right\}$$

=== Contour sets of a function ===
In the case of a function $f()$ considered in terms of relation $\triangleright$, reference to the contour sets of the function is implicitly to the contour sets of the implied relation

$$(a\succcurlyeq b)~\Leftarrow~[f(a)\triangleright f(b)]$$

== Examples ==
=== Arithmetic ===
Consider a real number $x$, and the relation $\ge$. Then

- the upper contour set of $x$ would be the set of numbers that were greater than or equal to $x$,
- the strict upper contour set of $x$ would be the set of numbers that were greater than $x$,
- the lower contour set of $x$ would be the set of numbers that were less than or equal to $x$, and
- the strict lower contour set of $x$ would be the set of numbers that were less than $x$.

Consider, more generally, the relation

$$(a\succcurlyeq b)~\Leftarrow~[f(a)\ge f(b)]$$

Then

- the upper contour set of $x$ would be the set of all $y$ such that $f(y)\ge f(x)$,
- the strict upper contour set of $x$ would be the set of all $y$ such that $f(y)>f(x)$,
- the lower contour set of $x$ would be the set of all $y$ such that $f(x)\ge f(y)$, and
- the strict lower contour set of $x$ would be the set of all $y$ such that $f(x)>f(y)$.

It would be technically possible to define contour sets in terms of the relation

$$(a\succcurlyeq b)~\Leftarrow~[f(a)\le f(b)]$$

though such definitions would tend to confound ready understanding.

In the case of a real-valued function $f()$ (whose arguments might or might not be themselves real numbers), reference to the contour sets of the function is implicitly to the contour sets of the relation

$$(a\succcurlyeq b)~\Leftarrow~[f(a)\ge f(b)]$$

Note that the arguments to $f()$ might be vectors, and that the notation used might instead be

$$[(a_1 ,a_2 ,\ldots)\succcurlyeq(b_1 ,b_2 ,\ldots)]~\Leftarrow~[f(a_1 ,a_2 ,\ldots)\ge f(b_1 ,b_2 ,\ldots)]$$

=== Economics ===
In economics, the set $X$ could be interpreted as a set of goods and services or of possible outcomes, the relation $\succ$ as strict preference, and the relationship $\succcurlyeq$ as weak preference. Then

- the upper contour set, or better set, of $x$ would be the set of all goods, services, or outcomes that were at least as desired as $x$,
- the strict upper contour set of $x$ would be the set of all goods, services, or outcomes that were more desired than $x$,
- the lower contour set, or worse set, of $x$ would be the set of all goods, services, or outcomes that were no more desired than $x$, and
- the strict lower contour set of $x$ would be the set of all goods, services, or outcomes that were less desired than $x$.

Such preferences might be captured by a utility function $u()$, in which case

- the upper contour set of $x$ would be the set of all $y$ such that $u(y)\ge u(x)$,
- the strict upper contour set of $x$ would be the set of all $y$ such that $u(y)>u(x)$,
- the lower contour set of $x$ would be the set of all $y$ such that $u(x)\ge u(y)$, and
- the strict lower contour set of $x$ would be the set of all $y$ such that $u(x)>u(y)$.

== Complementarity ==
On the assumption that $\succcurlyeq$ is a total ordering of $X$, the complement of the upper contour set is the strict lower contour set.

$$X^2\backslash\left\{ y~\backepsilon~y\succcurlyeq x\right\}=\left\{ y~\backepsilon~x\succ y\right\}$$
$$X^2\backslash\left\{ y~\backepsilon~x\succ y\right\}=\left\{ y~\backepsilon~y\succcurlyeq x\right\}$$

and the complement of the strict upper contour set is the lower contour set.

$$X^2\backslash\left\{ y~\backepsilon~y\succ x\right\}=\left\{ y~\backepsilon~x\succcurlyeq y\right\}$$
$$X^2\backslash\left\{ y~\backepsilon~x\succcurlyeq y\right\}=\left\{ y~\backepsilon~y\succ x\right\}$$

== See also ==
- Epigraph
- Hypograph

== Bibliography ==
- Andreu Mas-Colell, Michael D. Whinston, and Jerry R. Green, Microeconomic Theory (LCC HB172.M6247 1995), p43. ISBN 0-19-507340-1 (cloth) ISBN 0-19-510268-1 (paper)
