= Concavification =

In mathematics, concavification is the process of converting a non-concave function to a concave function. A related concept is convexification – converting a non-convex function to a convex function. It is especially important in economics and mathematical optimization.

== Concavification of a quasiconcave function by monotone transformation ==
An important special case of concavification is where the original function is a quasiconcave function. It is known that:

- Every concave function is quasiconcave, but the opposite is not true.
- Every monotone transformation of a quasiconcave function is also quasiconcave. For example, if $f : \mathbb{R}^n \to \mathbb{R}$ is quasiconcave and $g : \mathbb{R} \to \mathbb{R}$ is a monotonically-increasing function, then $x \mapsto g(f(x))$ is also quasiconcave.

Therefore, a natural question is: given a quasiconcave function $f : \mathbb{R}^n \to \mathbb{R}$, does there exist a monotonically increasing $g : \mathbb{R} \to \mathbb{R}$ such that $x \mapsto g(f(x))$ is concave?

=== Example and Counter Example ===
As an example, consider the function $x \mapsto f(x) = x^2$ on the domain $x\geq 0$. This function is quasiconcave, but it is not concave (in fact, it is strictly convex). It can be concavified, for example, using the monotone transformation $t \mapsto g(t) = t^{1/4}$, since $x \mapsto g(f(x))=\sqrt{x}$ is concave.

Not every concave function can be concavified in this way. A counter example was shown by Fenchel. His example is: $(x,y) \mapsto f(x,y) := y + \sqrt{x+y^2}$. Fenchel proved that this function is quasiconcave, but there is no monotone transformation $g : \mathbb{R}\to\mathbb{R}$ such that $(x, y) \mapsto g(f(x,y))$ is concave.

Based on these examples, we define a function to be concavifiable if there exists a monotone transformation that makes it concave. The question now becomes: what quasiconcave functions are concavifiable?

=== Concavifiability ===
Yakar Kannai treats the question in depth in the context of utility functions, giving sufficient conditions under which continuous convex preferences can be represented by concave utility functions.

His results were later generalized by Connell and Rasmussen, who give necessary and sufficient conditions for concavifiability. They show that the function $(x,y) \mapsto f(x,y) = e^{e^x}\cdot y$ violates their conditions and thus is not concavifiable. They prove that this function is strictly quasiconcave and its gradient is non-vanishing, but it is not concavifiable.

== See also ==
- Convex function
- Concave function
- Quasiconcave function
- Quasiconvex function
- Convex optimization
- Mathematical optimization
- Utility
