= Effective domain =

In convex analysis, a branch of mathematics, the effective domain extends of the domain of a function defined for functions that take values in the extended real number line $[-\infty, \infty] = \mathbb{R} \cup \{ \pm\infty \}.$

In convex analysis and variational analysis, a point at which some given extended real-valued function is minimized is typically sought, where such a point is called a global minimum point. The effective domain of this function is defined to be the set of all points in this function's domain at which its value is not equal to $+\infty.$ It is defined this way because it is only these points that have even a remote chance of being a global minimum point. Indeed, it is common practice in these fields to set a function equal to $+\infty$ at a point specifically to exclude that point from even being considered as a potential solution (to the minimization problem). Points at which the function takes the value $-\infty$ (if any) belong to the effective domain because such points are considered acceptable solutions to the minimization problem, with the reasoning being that if such a point was not acceptable as a solution then the function would have already been set to $+\infty$ at that point instead.

When a minimum point (in $X$) of a function $f : X \to [-\infty, \infty]$ is to be found but $f$'s domain $X$ is a proper subset of some vector space $V,$ then it often technically useful to extend $f$ to all of $V$ by setting $f(x) := +\infty$ at every $x \in V \setminus X.$ By definition, no point of $V \setminus X$ belongs to the effective domain of $f,$ which is consistent with the desire to find a minimum point of the original function $f : X \to [-\infty, \infty]$ rather than of the newly defined extension to all of $V.$

If the problem is instead a maximization problem (which would be clearly indicated) then the effective domain instead consists of all points in the function's domain at which it is not equal to $-\infty.$

== Definition ==
Suppose $f : X \to [-\infty, \infty]$ is a map valued in the extended real number line $[-\infty, \infty] = \mathbb{R} \cup \{ \pm\infty \}$ whose domain, which is denoted by $\operatorname{domain} f,$ is $X$ (where $X$ will be assumed to be a subset of some vector space whenever this assumption is necessary). Then the effective domain of $f$ is denoted by $\operatorname{dom} f$ and typically defined to be the set
$$\operatorname{dom} f = \{ x \in X ~:~ f(x) < +\infty \}$$
unless $f$ is a concave function or the maximum (rather than the minimum) of $f$ is being sought, in which case the effective domain of $f$ is instead the set
$$\operatorname{dom} f = \{ x \in X ~:~ f(x) > -\infty \}.$$

In convex analysis and variational analysis, $\operatorname{dom} f$ is usually assumed to be $\operatorname{dom} f = \{ x \in X ~:~ f(x) < +\infty \}$ unless clearly indicated otherwise.

== Characterizations ==
Let $\pi_{X} : X \times \mathbb{R} \to X$ denote the canonical projection onto $X,$ which is defined by $(x, r) \mapsto x.$ The effective domain of $f : X \to [-\infty, \infty]$ is equal to the image of $f$'s epigraph $\operatorname{epi} f$ under the canonical projection $\pi_{X}.$ That is

$\operatorname{dom} f = \pi_{X}\left( \operatorname{epi} f \right) = \left\{ x \in X ~:~ \text{ there exists } y \in \mathbb{R} \text{ such that } (x, y) \in \operatorname{epi} f \right\}.$

For a maximization problem (such as if the $f$ is concave rather than convex), the effective domain is instead equal to the image under $\pi_{X}$ of $f$'s hypograph.

== Properties ==
If a function never takes the value $+\infty,$ such as if the function is real-valued, then its domain and effective domain are equal.

A function $f : X \to [-\infty, \infty]$ is a proper convex function if and only if $f$ is convex, the effective domain of $f$ is nonempty, and $f(x) > -\infty$ for every $x \in X.$

== See also ==
- Proper convex function
- Epigraph (mathematics) – Region above a graph
- Hypograph (mathematics) – Region underneath a graph
