= Superadditivity =

Property of a function

In mathematics, a function $f$ is superadditive if $f(x+y) \geq f(x) + f(y)$ for all $x$ and $y$ in the domain of $f.$

Similarly, a sequence $a_1, a_2, \ldots$ is called superadditive if it satisfies the inequality $a_{n+m} \geq a_n + a_m$ for all $m$ and $n.$

The term "superadditive" is also applied to functions from a boolean algebra to the real numbers where $P(X \lor Y) \geq P(X) + P(Y),$ such as lower probabilities.

== Examples of superadditive functions ==
- The map $f(x) = x^2$ is a superadditive function for nonnegative real numbers because $f(x + y) = (x + y)^2 = x^2 + y^2 + 2 x y = f(x) + f(y) + 2 x y \ge f(x) + f(y).$
- The determinant is superadditive for nonnegative Hermitian matrix, that is, if $A, B \in \text{Mat}_n(\Complex)$ are nonnegative Hermitian then $\det(A + B) \geq \det(A) + \det(B).$ This follows from the Minkowski determinant theorem, which more generally states that $\det(\cdot)^{1/n}$ is superadditive (equivalently, concave) for nonnegative Hermitian matrices of size $n$: If $A, B \in \text{Mat}_n(\Complex)$ are nonnegative Hermitian then $\det(A + B)^{1/n} \geq \det(A)^{1/n} + \det(B)^{1/n}.$
- Horst Alzer proved that Hadamard's gamma function $H(x)$ is superadditive for all real numbers $x, y$ with $x, y \geq 1.5031.$
- Mutual information

== Properties ==
If $f$ is a superadditive function whose domain contains $0,$ then $f(0) \leq 0.$ To see this, simply set $x=0$ and $y=0$ in the defining inequality.

The negative of a superadditive function is subadditive.

== Fekete's lemma ==
The major reason for the use of superadditive sequences is the following lemma due to Michael Fekete.

Lemma: (Fekete) For every superadditive sequence $a_1, a_2, \ldots,$ the limit $\lim a_n/n$ is equal to the supremum $\sup a_n/n.$ (The limit may be positive infinity, as is the case with the sequence $a_n = \log n!$ for example.)

The analogue of Fekete's lemma holds for subadditive functions as well. There are extensions of Fekete's lemma that do not require the definition of superadditivity above to hold for all $m$ and $n.$ There are also results that allow one to deduce the rate of convergence to the limit whose existence is stated in Fekete's lemma if some kind of both superadditivity and subadditivity is present. A good exposition of this topic may be found in Steele (1997).

== See also ==
- Choquet integral – Subadditive or superadditive integral
- Inner measure
- Subadditivity – Property of some mathematical functions
- Sublinear function – Type of function in linear algebra
