= Kachurovskii's theorem =

Mathematical theorem

In mathematics, Kachurovskii's theorem is a theorem relating the convexity of a function on a Banach space to the monotonicity of its Fréchet derivative.

== Statement of the theorem ==
Let K be a convex subset of a Banach space V and let f : K → R ∪ {+∞} be an extended real-valued function that is Fréchet differentiable with derivative df(x) : V → R at each point x in K. (In fact, df(x) is an element of the continuous dual space V^{∗}.) Then the following are equivalent:

- f is a convex function;
- for all x and y in K,

$$\mathrm{d} f(x) (y - x) \leq f(y) - f(x);$$

- df is an (increasing) monotone operator, i.e., for all x and y in K,

$$\big( \mathrm{d} f(x) - \mathrm{d} f(y) \big) (x - y) \geq 0.$$
