= Hypograph (mathematics) =

Region underneath a graph

Hypograph of a function

In mathematics, the hypograph or subgraph of a function $f:\R^{n}\rightarrow \R$ is the set of points lying on or below its graph. A related definition is that of such a function's epigraph, which is the set of points on or above the function's graph.

The domain (rather than the codomain) of the function is not particularly important for this definition; it can be an arbitrary set instead of $\mathbb{R}^n$.

== Definition ==
The definition of the hypograph was inspired by that of the graph of a function, where the graph of $f : X \to Y$ is defined to be the set

$$\operatorname{graph} f := \left\{ (x, y) \in X \times Y ~:~ y = f(x) \right\}.$$

The hypograph or subgraph of a function $f : X \to [-\infty, \infty]$ valued in the extended real numbers $[-\infty, \infty] = \mathbb{R} \cup \{ \pm \infty \}$ is the set

$$\begin{alignat}{4}
\operatorname{hyp} f
&= \left\{ (x, r) \in X \times \mathbb{R} ~:~ r \leq f(x) \right\} \\
&= \left[ f^{-1}(\infty) \times \mathbb{R} \right] \cup \bigcup_{x \in f^{-1}(\mathbb{R})} (\{ x \} \times (-\infty, f(x)]).
\end{alignat}$$

Similarly, the set of points on or above the function is its epigraph. The strict hypograph is the hypograph with the graph removed:

$$\begin{alignat}{4}
\operatorname{hyp}_S f
&= \left\{ (x, r) \in X \times \mathbb{R} ~:~ r < f(x) \right\} \\
&= \operatorname{hyp} f \setminus \operatorname{graph} f \\
&= \bigcup_{x \in X} (\{ x \} \times (-\infty, f(x))).
\end{alignat}$$

Despite the fact that $f$ might take one (or both) of $\pm \infty$ as a value (in which case its graph would not be a subset of $X \times \mathbb{R}$), the hypograph of $f$ is nevertheless defined to be a subset of $X \times \mathbb{R}$ rather than of $X \times [-\infty, \infty].$

== Properties ==
The hypograph of a function $f$ is empty if and only if $f$ is identically equal to negative infinity.

A function is concave if and only if its hypograph is a convex set. The hypograph of a real affine function $g : \mathbb{R}^n \to \mathbb{R}$ is a halfspace in $\mathbb{R}^{n+1}.$

A function is upper semicontinuous if and only if its hypograph is closed.

== See also ==
- Effective domain
- Epigraph (mathematics) – Region above a graph
- Proper convex function
