= Choquet integral =

Subadditive or superadditive integral

A Choquet integral is a subadditive or superadditive integral created by the French mathematician Gustave Choquet in 1953. It was initially used in statistical mechanics and potential theory, but found its way into decision theory in the 1980s, where it is used as a way of measuring the expected utility of an uncertain event. It is applied specifically to membership functions and capacities. In imprecise probability theory, the Choquet integral is also used to calculate the lower expectation induced by a 2-monotone lower probability, or the upper expectation induced by a 2-alternating upper probability.

Using the Choquet integral to denote the expected utility of belief functions measured with capacities is a way to reconcile the Ellsberg paradox and the Allais paradox.

Multiobjective optimization problems seek Pareto optimal solutions, but the Pareto set of such solutions can be extremely large, especially with multiple objectives. To manage this, optimization often focuses on a specific function, such as a weighted sum, which typically results in solutions forming a convex envelope of the feasible set. However, to capture non-convex solutions, alternative aggregation operators like the Choquet integral can be used.

== Definition ==
The following notation is used:

- $S$ – a set.
- $\mathcal{F}$ – a collection of subsets of $S$.
- $f : S\to \mathbb{R}$ – a function.
- $\nu : \mathcal{F}\to \mathbb{R}^+$ – a monotone set function.

Assume that $f$ is measurable with respect to $\mathcal{F}$, that is

$$\forall x\in\mathbb{R}\colon \{s \in S \mid f (s) \geq x\}\in\mathcal{F}$$

Then the Choquet integral of $f$ with respect to $\nu$ is defined by:

$$(C)\int f d\nu :=
\int_{-\infty}^0
(\nu (\{s | f (s) \geq x\})-\nu(S))\, dx
+
\int^\infty_0
\nu (\{s | f (s) \geq x\})\, dx$$

where the integrals on the right-hand side are the usual Riemann integral (the integrands are integrable because they are monotone in $x$).

== Properties ==
In general the Choquet integral does not satisfy additivity. More specifically, if $\nu$ is not a probability measure, it may hold that

$$\int f \,d\nu + \int g \,d\nu \neq \int (f + g)\, d\nu.$$

for some functions $f$ and $g$.

The Choquet integral does satisfy the following properties.

=== Monotonicity ===
If $f\leq g$ then

$$(C)\int f\, d\nu \leq (C)\int g\, d\nu$$

=== Positive homogeneity ===
For all $\lambda\ge 0$ it holds that

$$(C)\int \lambda f \,d\nu = \lambda (C)\int f\, d\nu,$$

=== Comonotone additivity ===
If $f,g : S \rightarrow \mathbb{R}$ are comonotone functions, that is, if for all $s,s' \in S$ it holds that

$$(f(s) - f(s')) (g(s) - g(s')) \geq 0$$.
which can be thought of as $f$ and $g$ rising and falling together

then

$$(C)\int\, f d\nu + (C)\int g\, d\nu = (C)\int (f + g)\, d\nu.$$

=== Subadditivity ===
If $\nu$ is 2-alternating, then

$$(C)\int\, f d\nu + (C)\int g\, d\nu \ge (C)\int (f + g)\, d\nu.$$

=== Superadditivity ===
If $\nu$ is 2-monotone, then

$$(C)\int\, f d\nu + (C)\int g\, d\nu \le (C)\int (f + g)\, d\nu.$$

== Alternative representation ==
Let $G$ denote a cumulative distribution function such that $G^{-1}$ is $d H$ integrable. Then this following formula is often referred to as Choquet Integral:

$$\int_{-\infty}^\infty G^{-1}(\alpha) d H(\alpha) = -\int_{-\infty}^a H(G(x))dx+ \int_a^\infty \hat{H}(1-G(x)) dx,$$

where $\hat{H}(x)=H(1)-H(1-x)$.

- choose $H(x):=x$ to get $\int_0^1 G^{-1}(x)dx = E[X]$,
- choose $H(x):=1_{[\alpha,x]}$ to get $\int_0^1 G^{-1}(x)dH(x)= G^{-1}(\alpha)$

== Applications ==
The Choquet integral was applied in image processing, video processing and computer vision. In behavioral decision theory, Amos Tversky and Daniel Kahneman use the Choquet integral and related methods in their formulation of cumulative prospect theory.

== See also ==
- Nonlinear expectation
- Superadditivity
- Subadditivity
