= Invex function =

In vector calculus, an invex function is a differentiable function $f:\R^n \to \R$ for which there exists a vector-valued function $\eta$ such that

$$f(x) - f(u) \geq \eta(x, u) \cdot \nabla f(u), \,$$

for all $x, u\in\R^n$.

Invex functions were introduced by Hanson as a generalization of convex functions. Ben-Israel and Mond provided a simple proof that a function is invex if and only if every stationary point is a global minimum, a theorem first stated by Craven and Glover.

Hanson also showed that if the objective and the constraints of an optimization problem are invex with respect to the same function $\eta(x,u)$, then the Karush–Kuhn–Tucker conditions are sufficient for a global minimum.

== Type I invex functions ==
A slight generalization of invex functions called Type I invex functions are the most general class of functions for which the Karush–Kuhn–Tucker conditions are necessary and sufficient for a global minimum. Consider a mathematical program of the form

$$\begin{array}{rl}
\min & f(x)\\
\text{s.t.} & g(x)\leq0
\end{array}$$

where $f:\mathbb{R}^n\to\mathbb{R}$ and $g:\mathbb{R}^n\to\mathbb{R}^m$ are differentiable functions. Let $F=\{x\in\mathbb{R}^n\;|\;g(x)\leq0\}$ denote the feasible region of this program. The function $f$ is a Type I objective function and the function $g$ is a Type I constraint function at $x_0$ with respect to $\eta$ if there exists a vector-valued function $\eta$ defined on $F$ such that

$$f(x)-f(x_0)\geq\eta(x)\cdot\nabla{f(x_0)}$$

and

$$-g(x_0)\geq\eta(x)\cdot\nabla{g(x_0)}$$

for all $x\in{F}$. Note that, unlike invexity, Type I invexity is defined relative to a point $x_0$.

Theorem (Theorem 2.1 in): If $f$ and $g$ are Type I invex at a point $x^*$ with respect to $\eta$, and the Karush–Kuhn–Tucker conditions are satisfied at $x^*$, then $x^*$ is a global minimizer of $f$ over $F$.

== E-invex function ==
Let $E$ from $\mathbb{R}^n$ to $\mathbb{R}^{n}$ and $f$ from $\mathbb{M}$ to $\mathbb{R}$ be an $E$-differentiable function on a nonempty open set $\mathbb{M} \subset \mathbb{R}^n$. Then $f$ is said to be an E-invex function at $u$ if there exists a vector valued function $\eta$ such that

$$(f\circ E)(x) - (f\circ E)(u) \geq \nabla (f\circ E)(u) \cdot \eta(E(x), E(u)) , \,$$

for all $x$ and $u$ in $\mathbb{M}$.

E-invex functions were introduced by Abdulaleem as a generalization of differentiable convex functions.

== E-type I Functions ==
Let $E: \mathbb{R}^n \to \mathbb{R}^n$, and $M \subset \mathbb{R}^n$be an open E-invex set. A vector-valued pair $(f, g)$, where $f$ and $g$ represent objective and constraint functions respectively, is said to be E-type I with respect to a vector-valued function $\eta: M \times M \to \mathbb{R}^n$, at $u \in M$, if the following inequalities hold for all $x \in F_E=\{x\in\mathbb{R}^n\;|\;g(E(x))\leq 0\}$:

$f_i(E(x)) - f_i(E(u)) \geq \nabla f_i(E(u)) \cdot \eta(E(x), E(u)),$

$-g_j(E(u)) \geq \nabla g_j(E(u)) \cdot \eta(E(x), E(u)).$

=== Remark 1. ===
If $f$ and $g$ are differentiable functions and $E(x) = x$ ($E$ is an identity map), then the definition of E-type I functions reduces to the definition of type I functions introduced by Rueda and Hanson.

== See also ==
- Convex function
- Pseudoconvex function
- Quasiconvex function
