= Quasiconvex function =

Mathematical function with convex lower level sets

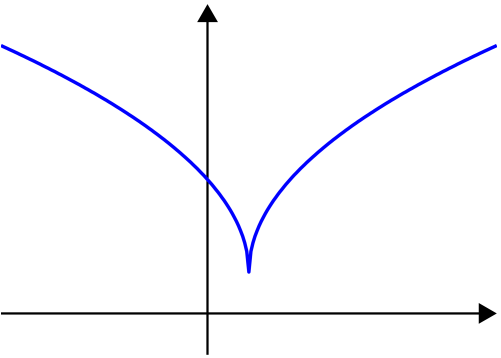
A quasiconvex function that is not convex

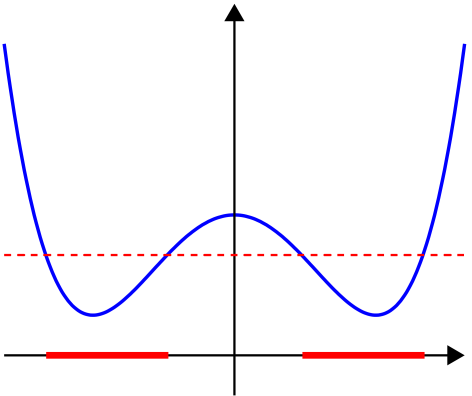
A function that is not quasiconvex: the set of points in the domain of the function for which the function values are below the dashed red line is the union of the two red intervals, which is not a convex set.

The probability density function of the normal distribution is quasiconcave but not concave.

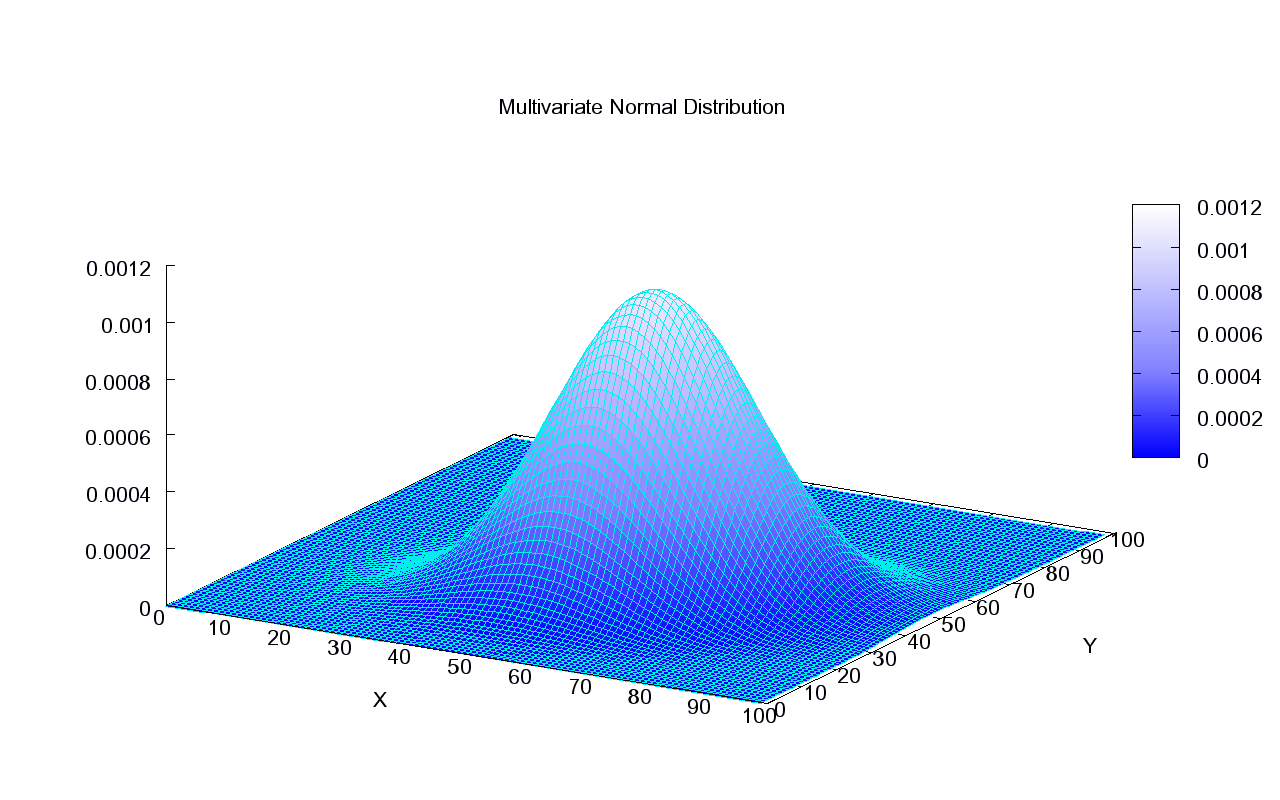
The bivariate normal joint density is quasiconcave.

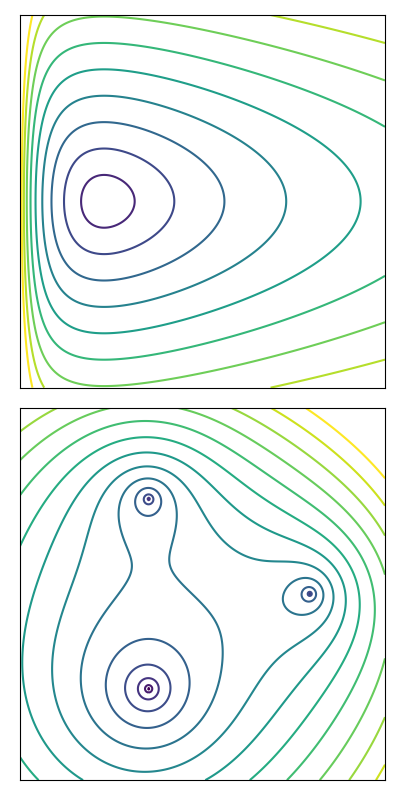
Contour plot of a quasiconvex function (top) where all level sets are convex, and a non-quasiconvex function (bottom) where some level sets are not convex and may even be disconnected.

In mathematics, a quasiconvex function is a real-valued function defined on a convex subset of a real vector space, such that for any real number y, the set of points on which the function value is at most y is a convex set. In other words, the inverse image of any set of the form $(-\infty,y)$ is a convex set. An equivalent definition is: along any interval in the function domain, the function attains the highest value on one of the endpoints.

Quasiconvexity is a more general property than convexity: all convex functions are also quasiconvex, but not all quasiconvex functions are convex.

For one-dimensional functions (functions on R), to check graphically whether a function is quasiconvex, move a horizontal line from minus infinity upwards, and verify that, whenever the line intersects the region above the function graph, the intersection is an interval.

A quasiconcave function is the negative of a quasiconvex function. In a quasiconcave function, for any real number y, the set of points on which the function value is at least y is convex. Equivalently, along any interval in the function domain, the function attains the lowest value on one of the endpoints. In one dimension, verify that, for any horizontal line that intersects the region below the function graph, the intersection is an interval.

Univariate unimodal functions are quasiconvex or quasiconcave, however this is not necessarily the case for functions with multiple arguments. For example, the 2-dimensional Rosenbrock function is unimodal but not quasiconvex and functions with star-convex sublevel sets can be unimodal without being quasiconvex.

== Definition and properties ==
A function $f:S \to \mathbb{R}$ defined on a convex subset $S$ of a real vector space is quasiconvex if for all $x, y \in S$ and $\lambda \in [0,1]$ we have

$$f(\lambda x + (1 - \lambda)y)\leq\max\big\{f(x),f(y)\big\}.$$

In words, the objective $f$ is quasiconvex if and only if the maximum of $f$ along a straight line between any two end points is never greater than the value at the higher endpoint. Note that the points $x$ and $y$ may be points in n-dimensional space. If the inequality is strict, i.e.

$$f(\lambda x + (1 - \lambda)y)<\max\big\{f(x),f(y)\big\}$$

for all $x \neq y$ and $\lambda \in (0,1)$, then $f$ is strictly quasiconvex. That is, strict quasiconvexity requires that a point directly between two other points must give a lower value of the function than one of the other points does.

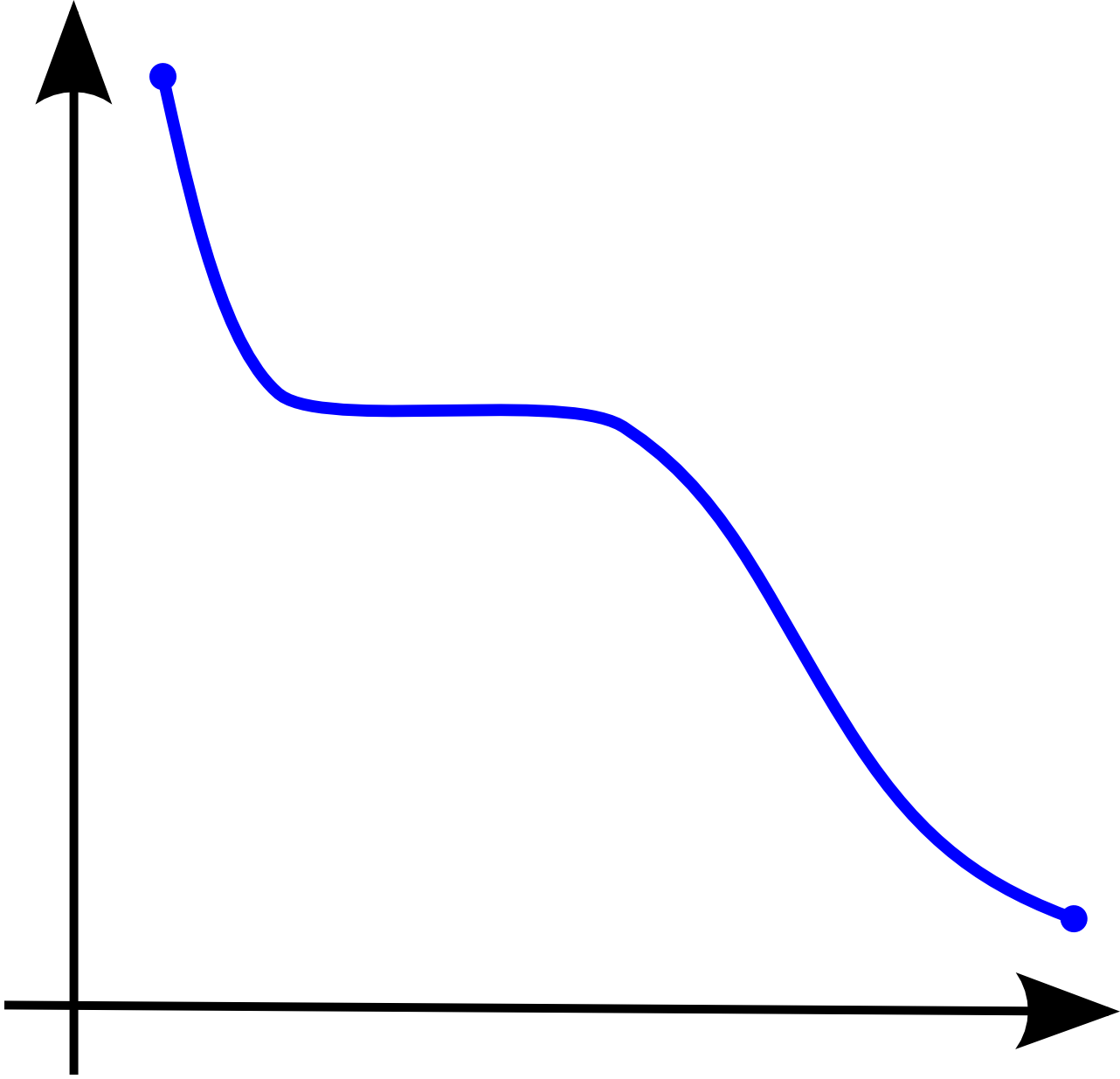
A quasilinear function is both quasiconvex and quasiconcave.

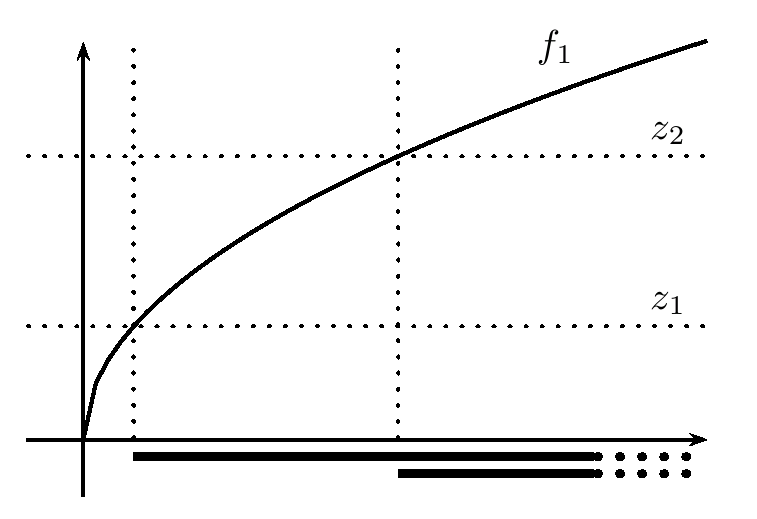
The graph of a function that is concave, quasiconvex, and quasilinear on the nonnegative real numbers.

An alternative way (see introduction) of defining a quasi-convex function $f(x)$ is to require that each sublevel set $S_\alpha(f) = \{x\mid f(x) \leq \alpha\}$ is a convex set. It follows that for every strictly quasiconvex function, there exist a strictly monotone increasing coordinate transformation $m:\mathbb{R}\to\mathbb{R}$ such that $m(f(x))$ is strictly convex.

A quasiconcave function is a function whose negative is quasiconvex, and a strictly quasiconcave function is a function whose negative is strictly quasiconvex. Equivalently a function $f$ is quasiconcave if and only if

$$f(\lambda x + (1 - \lambda)y)\geq\min\big\{f(x),f(y)\big\}.$$

A (strictly) quasiconvex function has (strictly) convex lower contour sets, while a (strictly) quasiconcave function has (strictly) convex upper contour sets. Unimodal probability distributions like the Gaussian distribution are common examples of quasi-concave functions that are not concave.

A function that is both quasiconvex and quasiconcave is quasilinear, and satisfies

$$\min\big\{f(x),f(y)\big\} \leq f(\lambda x + (1 - \lambda)y)\leq\max\big\{f(x),f(y)\big\}$$

For a quasilinear function defined on a plane, the level sets are always lines. More generally, the level sets of a quasilinear function over $\mathbb{R}^n$ are $n-1$-dimensional planes.

== Applications ==
Quasiconvex functions have applications in mathematical analysis, in mathematical optimization, and in game theory and economics.

=== Mathematical optimization ===
In nonlinear optimization, quasiconvex programming studies iterative methods that converge to a minimum (if one exists) for quasiconvex functions. Quasiconvex programming is a generalization of convex programming. Quasiconvex programming is used in the solution of "surrogate" dual problems, whose biduals provide quasiconvex closures of the primal problem, which therefore provide tighter bounds than do the convex closures provided by Lagrangian dual problems. In theory, quasiconvex programming and convex programming problems can be solved in reasonable amount of time, where the number of iterations grows like a polynomial in the dimension of the problem (and in the reciprocal of the approximation error tolerated); however, such theoretically "efficient" methods use "divergent-series" step size rules, which were first developed for classical subgradient methods. Classical subgradient methods using divergent-series rules are much slower than modern methods of convex minimization, such as subgradient projection methods, bundle methods of descent, and nonsmooth filter methods.

=== Economics and partial differential equations: Minimax theorems ===
In microeconomics, quasiconcave utility functions imply that consumers have convex preferences. Quasiconvex functions are important also in game theory, industrial organization, and general equilibrium theory, particularly for applications of Sion's minimax theorem. Generalizing a minimax theorem of John von Neumann, Sion's theorem is also used in the theory of partial differential equations.

== Preservation of quasiconvexity ==
=== Operations preserving quasiconvexity ===
- maximum of quasiconvex functions (i.e. $f = \max \left\lbrace f_1 , \ldots , f_n \right\rbrace$ ) is quasiconvex. Similarly, maximum of strict quasiconvex functions is strict quasiconvex. Similarly, the minimum of quasiconcave functions is quasiconcave, and the minimum of strictly-quasiconcave functions is strictly-quasiconcave.
- composition with a non-decreasing function : $g : \mathbb{R}^{n} \rightarrow \mathbb{R}$ quasiconvex, $h : \mathbb{R} \rightarrow \mathbb{R}$ non-decreasing, then $f = h \circ g$ is quasiconvex. Similarly, if $g : \mathbb{R}^{n} \rightarrow \mathbb{R}$ quasiconcave, $h : \mathbb{R} \rightarrow \mathbb{R}$ non-decreasing, then $f = h \circ g$ is quasiconcave.
- minimization (i.e. $f(x,y)$ quasiconvex, $C$ convex set, then $h(x) = \inf_{y \in C} f(x,y)$ is quasiconvex)

=== Operations not preserving quasiconvexity ===
- The sum of quasiconvex functions defined on the same domain need not be quasiconvex: In other words, if $f(x), g(x)$ are quasiconvex, then $(f+g)(x) = f(x) + g(x)$ need not be quasiconvex. For example, $\pm \operatorname{sign}(x \pm 1)$ are quasiconvex (in fact, quasilinear) functions whose sum is not quasiconvex.
- The sum of quasiconvex functions defined on different domains (i.e. if $f(x), g(y)$ are quasiconvex, $h(x,y) = f(x) + g(y)$) need not be quasiconvex. Such functions are called "additively decomposed" in economics and "separable" in mathematical optimization. For example, $f(x) = -x^2$ defined for positive $x > 0$ is quasiconvex, but $h(x, y) = f(x) + f(y)$ is not quasiconvex on the positive orthant.

== Examples ==
- Every convex function is quasiconvex.
- A concave function can be quasiconvex. For example, $x \mapsto \log(x)$ is both concave and quasiconvex.
- Any monotonic function is both quasiconvex and quasiconcave. More generally, a function which decreases up to a point and increases from that point on is quasiconvex (compare unimodality).
- The floor function $x\mapsto \lfloor x\rfloor$ is an example of a quasiconvex function that is neither convex nor continuous.

== See also ==
- Convex function
- Concave function
- Logarithmically concave function
- Pseudoconvexity in the sense of several complex variables (not generalized convexity)
- Pseudoconvex function
- Invex function
- Concavification
