= Concave function =

Negative of a convex function

In mathematics, a concave function is one for which the function value at any convex combination of elements in the domain is greater than or equal to that convex combination of those domain elements. Equivalently, a concave function is any function for which the hypograph is convex. The class of concave functions is in a sense the opposite of the class of convex functions. A concave function is also synonymously called concave downwards, concave down, convex upwards, convex cap, or upper convex.

== Definition ==
A real-valued function $f$ on an interval (or, more generally, a convex set in vector space) is said to be concave if, for any $x$ and $y$ in the interval and for any $\alpha \in [0,1]$,

$$f((1-\alpha )x+\alpha y)\geq (1-\alpha ) f(x)+\alpha f(y)$$

A function is called strictly concave if

$$f((1-\alpha )x+\alpha y) > (1-\alpha ) f(x)+\alpha f(y)$$

for any $\alpha \in (0,1)$ and $x \neq y$.

For a function $f: \mathbb{R} \to \mathbb{R}$, this second definition merely states that for every $z$ strictly between $x$ and $y$, the point $(z, f(z))$ on the graph of $f$ is above the straight line joining the points $(x, f(x))$ and $(y, f(y))$.

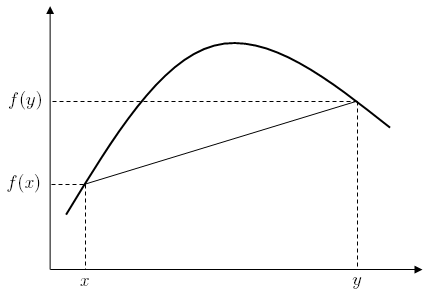

A function $f$ is quasiconcave if the upper contour sets of the function $S(a)=\{x: f(x)\geq a\}$ are convex sets.

== Properties ==
A cubic function is concave (left half) when its first derivative (red) is monotonically decreasing i.e. its second derivative (orange) is negative, and convex (right half) when its first derivative is monotonically increasing i.e. its second derivative is positive

=== Functions of a single variable ===
1. A differentiable function f is (strictly) concave on an interval if and only if its derivative function f ′ is (strictly) monotonically decreasing on that interval, that is, a concave function has a non-increasing (decreasing) slope.
2. Points where concavity changes (between concave and convex) are inflection points.
3. If f is twice-differentiable, then f is concave if and only if f ′′ is non-positive (or, informally, if the "acceleration" is non-positive). If f ′′ is negative then f is strictly concave, but the converse is not true, as shown by f(x) = −x^{4}.
4. If f is concave and differentiable, then it is bounded above by its first-order Taylor approximation:
  $$f(y) \leq f(x) + f'(x)[y-x]$$
5. A Lebesgue measurable function on an interval C is concave if and only if it is midpoint concave, that is, for any x and y in C
  $$f\left( \frac{x+y}2 \right) \ge \frac{f(x) + f(y)}2$$
6. If a function f is concave, and f(0) ≥ 0, then f is subadditive on $[0,\infty)$. Proof:
  - Since f is concave and 1 ≥ t ≥ 0, letting y = 0 we have
    $$f(tx) = f(tx+(1-t)\cdot 0) \ge t f(x)+(1-t)f(0) \ge t f(x) .$$
  - For $a,b\in[0,\infty)$:
    $$f(a) + f(b) = f \left((a+b) \frac{a}{a+b} \right) + f \left((a+b) \frac{b}{a+b} \right)
\ge \frac{a}{a+b} f(a+b) + \frac{b}{a+b} f(a+b) = f(a+b)$$

=== Functions of n variables ===
1. A function f is concave over a convex set if and only if the function −f is a convex function over the set.
2. The sum of two concave functions is itself concave and so is the pointwise minimum of two concave functions, i.e. the set of concave functions on a given domain form a semifield.
3. Near a strict local maximum in the interior of the domain of a function, the function must be concave; as a partial converse, if the derivative of a strictly concave function is zero at some point, then that point is a local maximum.
4. Any local maximum of a concave function is also a global maximum. A strictly concave function will have at most one global maximum.

== Examples ==
- The functions $f(x)=-x^2$ and $g(x)=\sqrt{x}$ are concave on their domains, as their second derivatives $f''(x) = -2$ and $g''(x) =-\frac{1}{4 x^{3/2}}$ are always negative.
- The logarithm function $f(x) = \log{x}$ is concave on its domain $(0,\infty)$, as its derivative $\frac{1}{x}$ is a strictly decreasing function.
- Any affine function $f(x)=ax+b$ is both concave and convex, but neither strictly-concave nor strictly-convex.
- The sine function is concave on the interval $[0, \pi]$.
- The function $f(B) = \log |B|$, where $|B|$ is the determinant of a nonnegative-definite matrix B, is concave.

== Applications ==
- Rays bending in the computation of radiowave attenuation in the atmosphere involve concave functions.
- In expected utility theory for choice under uncertainty, cardinal utility functions of risk averse decision makers are concave.
- In microeconomic theory, production functions are usually assumed to be concave over some or all of their domains, resulting in diminishing returns to input factors.
- In thermodynamics and information theory, entropy is a concave function. In the case of thermodynamic entropy, without phase transition, entropy as a function of extensive variables is strictly concave. If the system can undergo phase transition, and if it is allowed to split into two subsystems of different phase (phase separation, e.g. boiling), the entropy-maximal parameters of the subsystems will result in a combined entropy precisely on the straight line between the two phases. This means that the "effective entropy" of a system with phase transition is the convex envelope of entropy without phase separation; therefore, the entropy of a system including phase separation will be non-strictly concave.

== See also ==
- Concave polygon
- Jensen's inequality
- Logarithmically concave function
- Quasiconcave function
- Concavification

== Further References ==
- Crouzeix, J.-P. (2008). "Quasi-concavity". In Durlauf, Steven N.; Blume, Lawrence E (eds.). The New Palgrave Dictionary of Economics (Second ed.). Palgrave Macmillan. pp. 815–816. doi:10.1057/9780230226203.1375. ISBN 978-0-333-78676-5.
- Rao, Singiresu S. (2009). Engineering Optimization: Theory and Practice. John Wiley and Sons. p. 779. ISBN 978-0-470-18352-6.
