= Domain of a function =

Set of all things that may be the input of a mathematical function

A function f from X to Y. The set of points in the red oval X is the domain of f. The set of points in the blue oval Y is the codomain of f. The set of points in the yellow oval is the range of f.

Graph of the arcsine and arccosine functions, f(x) = arcsin(x) and f(x) = arccos(x), each of whose domain consists of the set of real numbers [–1,1] inclusively

In mathematics, the domain of a function is the set of inputs accepted by the function. It is sometimes denoted by $\operatorname{dom}(f)$ or $\operatorname{dom }f$, where f is the function. In layman's terms, the domain of a function can generally be thought of as "what x can be".

More precisely, given a function $f\colon X\to Y$, the domain of f is X. In modern mathematical language, the domain is part of the definition of a function rather than a property of it.

In the special case that X and Y are both sets of real numbers, the function f can be graphed in the Cartesian coordinate system. In this case, the domain is represented on the x-axis of the graph, as the projection of the graph of the function onto the x-axis.

For a function $f\colon X\to Y$, the set Y is called the codomain: the set to which all outputs must belong. The set of specific outputs the function assigns to elements of X is called its range or image. The image of $f$ is a subset of Y, shown as the yellow oval in the accompanying diagram.

Any function can be restricted to a subset of its domain. The restriction of $f \colon X \to Y$ to $A$, where $A\subseteq X$, is written as $\left. f \right|_A \colon A \to Y$.

== Natural domain ==
If a real function f is given by a formula, it may be not defined for some values of the variable. In this case, it is a partial function, and the set of real numbers on which the formula can be evaluated to a real number is called the natural domain or domain of definition of f. In many contexts, a partial function is called simply a function, and its natural domain is called simply its domain.

=== Examples ===
- The function $f$ defined by $f(x)=\frac{1}{x}$ cannot be evaluated at 0. Therefore, the natural domain of $f$ is the set of real numbers excluding 0, which can be denoted by $\mathbb{R} \setminus \{ 0 \}$ or $\{x\in\mathbb R:x\ne 0\}$.
- The piecewise function $f$ defined by
  $$f(x) = \begin{cases}
1/x&x\not=0\\
0&x=0
\end{cases},$$
  has as its natural domain the set $\mathbb{R}$ of real numbers.
- The square root function $f(x)=\sqrt x$ has as its natural domain the set of non-negative real numbers, which can be denoted by $\mathbb R_{\geq 0}$, the interval $[0,\infty)$, or $\{x\in\mathbb R:x\geq 0\}$.
- The tangent function, denoted $\tan$, has as its natural domain the set of all real numbers which are not of the form $\tfrac{\pi}{2} + k \pi$ for some integer $k$, which can be written as $\mathbb R \setminus \{\tfrac{\pi}{2}+k\pi: k\in\mathbb Z\}$.

== Other uses ==
The term domain is also commonly used in a different sense in mathematical analysis: a domain is a non-empty connected open set in a topological space. In particular, in real and complex analysis, a domain is a non-empty connected open subset of the real coordinate space $\R^n$ or the complex coordinate space $\C^n.$

Sometimes such a domain is used as the domain of a function, although functions may be defined on more general sets. The two concepts are sometimes conflated as in, for example, the study of partial differential equations: in that case, a domain is the open connected subset of $\R^{n}$ where a problem is posed, making it both an analysis-style domain and also the domain of the unknown function(s) sought.

== Set theoretical notions ==
For example, it is sometimes convenient in set theory to permit the domain of a function to be a proper class X, in which case there is formally no such thing as a triple (X, Y, G). With such a definition, functions do not have a domain, although some authors still use it informally after introducing a function in the form f: X → Y.

== See also ==
- Argument of a function
- Attribute domain
- Bijection, injection and surjection
- Codomain
- Domain decomposition
- Effective domain
- Endofunction
- Image (mathematics)
- Lipschitz domain
- Naive set theory
- Range of a function
- Support (mathematics)
