= Outline of linear algebra =

This is an outline of topics related to linear algebra, the branch of mathematics concerning linear equations and linear maps and their representations in vector spaces and through matrices.

== Linear equations ==
Linear equation

- System of linear equations
- Determinant
  - Minor
  - Cauchy–Binet formula
- Cramer's rule
- Gaussian elimination
- Gauss–Jordan elimination
- Overcompleteness
- Strassen algorithm

== Matrices ==
Matrix

- Matrix addition
- Matrix multiplication
- Basis transformation matrix
- Characteristic polynomial
- Trace
- Eigenvalue, eigenvector and eigenspace
  - Cayley–Hamilton theorem
  - Spread of a matrix
  - Jordan normal form
  - Weyr canonical form
- Rank
- Matrix inversion, invertible matrix
  - Pseudoinverse
- Adjugate
- Transpose
  - Dot product
  - Symmetric matrix
  - Orthogonal matrix
  - Skew-symmetric matrix
  - Conjugate transpose
    - Unitary matrix
    - Hermitian matrix, Antihermitian matrix
- Positive-definite, positive-semidefinite matrix
- Pfaffian
- Projection
- Spectral theorem
- Perron–Frobenius theorem
- List of matrices
  - Diagonal matrix, main diagonal
    - Diagonalizable matrix
  - Triangular matrix
  - Tridiagonal matrix
  - Block matrix
  - Sparse matrix
  - Hessenberg matrix
  - Hessian matrix
  - Vandermonde matrix
  - Stochastic matrix
  - Toeplitz matrix
    - Circulant matrix
  - Hankel matrix
  - (0,1)-matrix
  - Bohemian matrices

== Matrix decompositions ==
Matrix decomposition

- Cholesky decomposition
- LU decomposition
- QR decomposition
- Polar decomposition
- Reducing subspace
- Spectral theorem
- Singular value decomposition
  - Higher-order singular value decomposition
- Schur decomposition
  - Schur complement
  - Haynsworth inertia additivity formula

== Relations ==
- Matrix equivalence
- Matrix congruence
- Matrix similarity
- Matrix consimilarity
- Row equivalence

== Computations ==
- Elementary row operations
- Householder transformation
- Least squares, linear least squares
- Gram–Schmidt process
- Woodbury matrix identity

== Vector spaces ==
Vector space

- Linear combination
- Linear span
- Linear independence
- Scalar multiplication
- Basis
  - Change of basis
  - Hamel basis
- Cyclic decomposition theorem
- Dimension theorem for vector spaces
  - Hamel dimension
- Examples of vector spaces
- Linear map
  - Shear mapping or Galilean transformation
  - Squeeze mapping or Lorentz transformation
- Linear subspace
  - Row and column spaces
  - Column space
  - Row space
  - Cyclic subspace
  - Null space, nullity
  - Rank–nullity theorem
  - Nullity theorem
- Dual space
  - Linear function
  - Linear functional
- Category of vector spaces

== Structures ==
- Topological vector space
- Normed vector space
- Inner product space
  - Euclidean space
  - Orthogonality
  - Orthogonal complement
  - Orthogonal projection
  - Orthogonal group
- Pseudo-Euclidean space
  - Null vector
  - Indefinite orthogonal group
- Orientation (geometry)
  - Improper rotation
- Symplectic structure

== Multilinear algebra ==
Multilinear algebra

- Tensor
  - Classical treatment of tensors
  - Component-free treatment of tensors
  - Gamas's Theorem
- Outer product
- Tensor algebra
  - Exterior algebra
  - Symmetric algebra
  - Clifford algebra
  - Geometric algebra

== Topics related to affine spaces ==
Affine space

- Affine transformation
- Affine group
- Affine geometry
- Affine coordinate system
- Flat (geometry)
- Cartesian coordinate system
- Euclidean group
- Poincaré group
- Galilean group

== Projective space ==
Projective space

- Projective transformation
- Projective geometry
- Projective linear group
- Quadric and conic section

== See also ==
- Glossary of linear algebra
- Glossary of tensor theory
