= Matrix equivalence =

Mathematical equivalence relation

In linear algebra, two rectangular m-by-n matrices A and B are called equivalent if

$$B = Q^{-1} A P$$

for some invertible n-by-n matrix P and some invertible m-by-m matrix Q. Equivalent matrices represent the same linear transformation V → W under two different choices of a pair of bases of V and W, with P and Q being the change of basis matrices in V and W respectively.

The notion of equivalence should not be confused with that of similarity, which is only defined for square matrices, and is much more restrictive (similar matrices are certainly equivalent, but equivalent square matrices need not be similar). That notion corresponds to matrices representing the same endomorphism V → V under two different choices of a single basis of V, used both for initial vectors and their images.

== Properties ==
Matrix equivalence is an equivalence relation on the space of rectangular matrices.

For two rectangular matrices of the same size, their equivalence can also be characterized by the following conditions

- The matrices can be transformed into one another by a combination of elementary row and column operations.
- Two matrices are equivalent if and only if they have the same rank.

If matrices are row equivalent then they are also matrix equivalent. However, the converse does not hold; matrices that are matrix equivalent are not necessarily row equivalent. This makes matrix equivalence a generalization of row equivalence.

== Canonical form ==
The rank property yields an intuitive canonical form for matrices of the equivalence class of rank $k$ as

$$\begin{pmatrix}
1 & 0 & 0 & & \cdots & & 0 \\
0 & 1 & 0 & & \cdots & & 0 \\
0 & 0 & \ddots & & & & 0\\
\vdots & & & 1 & & & \vdots \\
& & & & 0 & & \\
& & & & & \ddots &  \\
0 & & & \cdots & & & 0
\end{pmatrix}$$,

where the number of $1$s on the diagonal is equal to $k$. This is a special case of the Smith normal form, which generalizes this concept on vector spaces to free modules over principal ideal domains. Thus:

Theorem: Any mxn matrix of rank k is matrix equivalent to the mxn matrix that is all zeroes except that the first k diagonal entries are ones. Corollary: Matrix equivalent classes are characterized by rank: two same-sided matrices are matrix equivalent if and only if they have the same rank.

== 2x2 matrices ==
2x2 matrices only have three possible ranks: zero, one, or two. This means all 2x2 matrices fit into one of three matrix equivalent classes:

$$\begin{pmatrix}
0 & 0 \\
0 & 0\\
\end{pmatrix}$$,
$$\begin{pmatrix}
1 & 0 \\
0 & 0\\
\end{pmatrix}$$,
$$\begin{pmatrix}
1 & 0 \\
0 & 1 \\
\end{pmatrix}$$

This means all 2x2 matrices are equivalent to one of these matrices. There is only one zero rank matrix, but the other two classes have infinitely many members; The representative matrices above are the simplest matrix for each class.

== Matrix similarity ==
Matrix similarity is a special case of matrix equivalence. If two matrices are similar then they are also equivalent. However, the converse is not true. For example these two matrices are equivalent but not similar:

$$\begin{pmatrix}
1 & 0 \\
0 & 1 \\
\end{pmatrix}$$,
$$\begin{pmatrix}
1 & 2 \\
0 & 3 \\
\end{pmatrix}$$

== See also ==
- Row equivalence
- Matrix congruence
