= Congruent transformation =

In mathematics, a congruent transformation (or congruence transformation) is:

- Another term for an isometry; see congruence (geometry).
- A transformation of the form A → P^{T}AP, where A and P are square matrices, P is invertible, and P^{T} denotes the transpose of P; see Matrix Congruence and congruence in linear algebra.
