= Sylvester's law of inertia =

Theorem of matrix algebra of invariance properties under basis transformations

Sylvester's law of inertia is a theorem in matrix algebra about certain properties of the coefficient matrix of a real quadratic form that remain invariant under a change of basis. Namely, if $S$ is a symmetric matrix, then for any invertible matrix $P$, the numbers of positive, negative, and zero eigenvalues of $S' = PSP^\mathsf{T}$ are constant (i.e., the inertia of $S'$ is constant). This result is particularly useful when $S'$ is diagonal, as the inertia of a diagonal matrix can easily be obtained by looking at the signs of its diagonal elements.

This property is named after James Joseph Sylvester, who published its proof in 1852.

== Statement ==
Let $S$ be a symmetric square matrix of order $n$ with real entries. Any non-singular square matrix $P$ of the same order is said to transform $S$ into another symmetric matrix $S' = PSP^\mathsf{T}$, also of order $n$, where $P^\mathsf{T}$ is the transpose of $P$. It is also said that matrices $S$ and $S'$ are congruent. If $S$ is the coefficient matrix of some quadratic form on $\R^n$, then $S'$ is the coefficient matrix of the same form after the change of basis defined by $P$.

A symmetric matrix $S$ can always be transformed in this way into a diagonal matrix $D$ which has entries only $0$, $+1$, $-1$ along the diagonal. Sylvester's law of inertia states that the number of diagonal entries of each kind is an invariant of $S$, i.e., does not depend on the matrix $P$ used.

The number of $+1$'s, denoted $n_+$, is called the positive index of inertia of $S$, and the number of $-1$'s, denoted $n_-$, is called the negative index of inertia of $S$. The number of $0$'s, denoted $n_0$, is the dimension of the null space of $S$, known as the nullity of $S$. These numbers satisfy the obvious relation

$n_{0}+n_{+}+n_{-} = n$.

The difference $\mathrm{sgn}(S) = n_+ - n_-$ is usually called the signature of $S$. However, some authors use that term for the triple $(n_0,n_+,n_-)$ consisting of the nullity, the positive, and the negative indices of inertia of $S$. For a non-degenerate form of a given dimension, these are equivalent data; but in general, the triple yields more data.

If the matrix $S$ has the property that every principal upper left $k \times k$ minor $\Delta_k$ is non-zero, then the negative index of inertia is equal to the number of sign changes in the sequence

$\Delta_0 = 1, \Delta_1, \ldots, \Delta_n = \det S$.

== Statement in terms of eigenvalues ==
The law can also be stated as follows: two symmetric square matrices $S$ and $S'$ of the same size have the same numbers of positive, negative, and zero eigenvalues if and only if they are congruent (i.e., $S' = PSP^\mathsf{T}$ for some non-singular square matrix $P$).

The positive and negative indices of a symmetric matrix $S$ are also the numbers of positive and negative eigenvalues of $S$. Any symmetric real matrix $S$ has an eigendecomposition of the form $QEQ^\mathsf{T}$, where $E$ is a diagonal matrix containing the eigenvalues of $S$, and $Q$ is an orthogonal square matrix containing the eigenvectors. The matrix $E$ can be written $E = WDW^\mathsf{T}$, where $D$ is diagonal with entries $0,+1,-1$, and $W$ is diagonal with each $W_{i,i} = \sqrt{ \vert E_{i,i} \vert }$. The matrix $P = QW$ transforms $D$ to $S$, since $S = QEQ^\mathsf{T} = QW ~ D ~ W^\mathsf{T} \! Q^\mathsf{T}$.

== Statement in terms of quadratic forms ==
A real quadratic form $q$ in $n$ variables (or on an $n$-dimensional real vector space) can, by a suitable change of basis (by non-singular linear transformation from $x$ to $y$), be brought to the diagonal form

$q(x_1,x_2,\ldots,x_n) = \sum_{i=1}^n a_i {x_i}^2$, with each $a_i \in \{ 0,1,-1 \}$.

Sylvester's law of inertia states that the number of coefficients of a given sign is an invariant of $q$, i.e., does not depend on a particular choice of diagonalizing basis.

Expressed geometrically, the law of inertia says that all maximal subspaces on which the restriction of the quadratic form is positive definite (respectively, negative definite) have the same dimension. These dimensions are the positive and negative indices of inertia of $q$.

== Generalizations ==
Two complex matrices (i.e., with complex entries) $A$ and $B$ are said to be $\mathbf{*}$-congruent if (and only if) there exists a non-singular complex matrix $P$ such that $B = PAP^*$, where $P^*$ denotes the conjugate transpose of $P$.

The definition of inertia is still valid for a Hermitian matrix, as its eigenvalues are always real numbers.

Sylvester's law of inertia can be generalized to complex matrices:
Two Hermitian matrices $A$ and $B$ are $*$-congruent if and only if they have the same inertia.

Ostrowski proved a quantitative generalization of Sylvester's law of inertia:
If two complex matrices $A$ and $B$ are $*$-congruent, with $B = PAP^*$ where $P$ is a non-singular complex matrix, then their eigenvalues $\lambda_j$ are related by

$\lambda_{j}(B) = \theta_j ~ \lambda_{j}(A)$,

where $j = 1, \ldots, n$, and each $\theta_j$ is such that

$\lambda_{n}(PP^*) \leq \theta_j \leq \lambda_{1}(PP^*)$.

A theorem due to Ikramov generalizes the law of inertia to normal matrices:
Two normal matrices $A$ and $B$ are $*$-congruent if and only if they have the same number of eigenvalues on each open ray from the origin in the complex plane. (Note: For example, the matrices $$A = \begin{bmatrix} 2 & 1 & 0 \\ 1 & 2 & 0 \\ 0 & 0 & i \end{bmatrix} \quad \text{and} \quad B = \begin{bmatrix} 2 & 3 & 0 \\ 3 & 6 & 0 \\ 0 & 0 & 4i \end{bmatrix}$$ are both normal. $A$ and $B$ are $*$-congruent: $$B = M^* \! A ~\! M, \quad \text{where} \quad M^* = \begin{bmatrix} 1 & 0 & 0 \\ 1 & 1 & 0 \\ 0 & 0 & 2 \end{bmatrix} \quad \text{and} \quad M = \begin{bmatrix} 1 & 1 & 0 \\ 0 & 1 & 0 \\ 0 & 0 & 2 \end{bmatrix}.$$ Both $A$ and $B$ have two eigenvalues on the open ray $\mathbf{]} 0, 1 )$ and one eigenvalue on the open ray $\mathbf{]} 0, i )$; denoting by respectively $\lambda_j$ and $\mu_j$ the eigenvalues of $A$ and $B$: $$\begin{matrix} \lambda_1 &= & 1, & \quad & \lambda_2 &= & 3, & \quad & \lambda_3 &= & i; \\ \mu_1 &= & 4 - \sqrt{13}, & \quad & \mu_2 &= & 4 + \sqrt{13}, & \quad & \mu_3 &= & 4i. \end{matrix}$$)

== See also ==
- Metric signature
- Morse theory
- Cholesky decomposition
- Haynsworth inertia additivity formula
