= Spread of a matrix =

Mathematical term

In mathematics, and more specifically matrix theory, the spread of a matrix is the largest distance in the complex plane between any two eigenvalues of the matrix.

== Definition ==
Let $A$ be a square matrix with eigenvalues $\lambda_1, \ldots, \lambda_n$. That is, these values $\lambda_i$ are the complex numbers such that there exists a vector $v_i$ on which $A$ acts by scalar multiplication:

$$Av_i=\lambda_i v_i.$$

Then the spread of $A$ is the non-negative number

$$s(A) = \max \{|\lambda_i - \lambda_j| : i,j=1,\ldots n\}.$$

== Examples ==
- For the zero matrix and the identity matrix, the spread is zero. The zero matrix has only zero as its eigenvalues, and the identity matrix has only one as its eigenvalues. In both cases, all eigenvalues are equal, so no two eigenvalues can be at nonzero distance from each other.
- For a projection, the only eigenvalues are zero and one. A projection matrix therefore has a spread that is either $0$ (if all eigenvalues are equal) or $1$ (if there are two different eigenvalues).
- All eigenvalues of a unitary matrix $A$ lie on the unit circle. Therefore, in this case, the spread is at most equal to the diameter of the circle, the number 2.
- The spread of a matrix depends only on the spectrum of the matrix (its multiset of eigenvalues). If a second matrix $B$ of the same size is invertible, then $BAB^{-1}$ has the same spectrum as $A$. Therefore, it also has the same spread as $A$.

== See also ==
- Field of values
