= Range space =

The term range space has multiple meanings in mathematics:

- In linear algebra, it refers to the column space of a matrix, the set of all possible linear combinations of its column vectors.
- In computational geometry, it refers to a hypergraph, a pair (X, R) where each r in R is a subset of X.
