= Elementary operations =

Elementary operations can refer to:

- the operations in elementary arithmetic: addition, subtraction, multiplication, division.
- elementary row operations or elementary column operations.
