= Metric signature =

Number of positive, negative and zero eigenvalues of a metric tensor

In mathematics, the signature of a metric tensor g (or equivalently, a real quadratic form thought of as a real symmetric bilinear form on a finite-dimensional vector space) is the number (counted with multiplicity) of positive, negative and zero eigenvalues of the real symmetric matrix g_{ab} of the metric tensor with respect to a basis. Alternatively, it can be defined as the dimensions of a maximal positive and null subspace. By Sylvester's law of inertia these numbers do not depend on the choice of basis and thus can be used to classify the metric. It is denoted by three integers (v, p, r), where v is the number of positive eigenvalues, p is the number of negative ones and r is the number of zero eigenvalues of the metric tensor. It can also be denoted (v, p) implying r = 0, or as an explicit list of signs of eigenvalues such as (+, −, −, −) or (−, +, +, +) for the signatures (1, 3, 0) and (3, 1, 0), respectively. The choice of the variable names v and p reflects the convention in relativistic physics that v represents the number of time or virtual dimensions, and p the number of space or physical dimensions.

The signature is said to be indefinite or mixed if both v and p are nonzero, and degenerate if r is nonzero. A Riemannian metric is a metric with a positive definite signature (v, 0). A Lorentzian metric is a metric with signature (p, 1), or (1, p).

There is another notion of signature of a nondegenerate metric tensor given by a single number s defined as (v − p), where v and p are as above, which is equivalent to the above definition when the dimension n = v + p is given or implicit. For example, s = 1 − 3 = −2 for (+, −, −, −) and its mirroring s′ = −s = +2 for (−, +, +, +).

== Definition ==
The signature of a metric tensor is defined as the signature of the corresponding quadratic form. It is the number (v, p, r) of positive, negative and zero eigenvalues of any matrix (i.e. in any basis for the underlying vector space) representing the form, counted with their algebraic multiplicities. Usually, r = 0 is required, which is the same as saying a metric tensor must be nondegenerate, i.e. no nonzero vector is orthogonal to all vectors.

By Sylvester's law of inertia, the numbers (v, p, r) are basis independent.

== Properties ==
=== Signature and dimension ===
By the spectral theorem a symmetric n × n matrix over the reals is always diagonalizable, and has therefore exactly n real eigenvalues (counted with algebraic multiplicity). Thus v + p = n = dim(V).

=== Sylvester's law of inertia: independence of basis choice and existence of orthonormal basis ===
According to Sylvester's law of inertia, the signature of the scalar product (a.k.a. real symmetric bilinear form), g does not depend on the choice of basis. Moreover, for every metric g of signature (v, p, r) there exists a basis such that g_{ab} = +1 for a = b = 1, ..., v, g_{ab} = −1 for a = b = v + 1, ..., v + p and g_{ab} = 0 otherwise. It follows that there exists an isometry (V_{1}, g_{1}) → (V_{2}, g_{2}) if and only if the signatures of g_{1} and g_{2} are equal. Likewise the signature is equal for two congruent matrices and classifies a matrix up to congruency. Equivalently, the signature is constant on the orbits of the general linear group GL(V) on the space of symmetric rank 2 contravariant tensors S^{2}V^{∗} and classifies each orbit.

=== Geometrical interpretation of the indices ===
The number v (resp. p) is the maximal dimension of a vector subspace on which the scalar product g is positive-definite (resp. negative-definite), and r is the dimension of the radical of the scalar product g or the null subspace of symmetric matrix g_{ab} of the scalar product. Thus a nondegenerate scalar product has signature (v, p, 0), with v + p = n. A duality of the special cases (v, p, 0) correspond to two scalar eigenvalues which can be transformed into each other by the mirroring reciprocally.

== Examples ==
=== Matrices ===
The signature of the n × n identity matrix is (n, 0, 0). The signature of a diagonal matrix is the number of positive, negative and zero numbers on its main diagonal.

The following matrices have both the same signature (1, 1, 0), therefore they are congruent because of Sylvester's law of inertia:

$$\begin{pmatrix} 1 & 0  \\ 0 & -1 \end{pmatrix}, \quad \begin{pmatrix} 0 & 1  \\ 1 & 0 \end{pmatrix}.$$

=== Scalar products ===
The standard scalar product defined on $\mathbb{R}^n$ has the n-dimensional signatures (v, p, r), where v + p = n and rank r = 0.

In physics, the Minkowski space is a spacetime manifold $\R^4$ with v = 1 and p = 3 bases, and has a scalar product defined by either the $\check g$ matrix:

$$\check g=\begin{pmatrix} -1 & 0 & 0 & 0 \\ 0 & 1 & 0 & 0 \\ 0 & 0 & 1 & 0 \\ 0 & 0 & 0 & 1 \end{pmatrix}$$

which has signature $(1, 3, 0)^-$ and known as space-supremacy or space-like; or the mirroring signature $(1,3, 0)^+$, known as virtual-supremacy or time-like with the $\hat g$ matrix.

$$\hat g=\begin{pmatrix} 1 & 0 & 0 & 0 \\ 0 & -1 & 0 & 0 \\ 0 & 0 & -1 & 0 \\ 0 & 0 & 0 & -1 \end{pmatrix}=-\check g$$

== How to compute the signature ==
There are some methods for computing the signature of a matrix.

- For any nondegenerate symmetric n × n matrix, diagonalize it (or find all of eigenvalues of it) and count the number of positive and negative signs.
- For a symmetric matrix, the characteristic polynomial will have all real roots whose signs may in some cases be completely determined by Descartes' rule of signs.
- Lagrange's algorithm gives a way to compute an orthogonal basis, and thus compute a diagonal matrix congruent (thus, with the same signature) to the other one: the signature of a diagonal matrix is the number of positive, negative and zero elements on its diagonal.
- According to Jacobi's criterion, a symmetric matrix is positive-definite if and only if all the determinants of its main minors are positive.

== Signature in physics ==
In mathematics, the usual convention for any Riemannian manifold is to use a positive-definite metric tensor (meaning that after diagonalization, elements on the diagonal are all positive).

In theoretical physics, spacetime is modeled by a pseudo-Riemannian manifold. The signature counts how many time-like or space-like characters are in the spacetime, in the sense defined by special relativity: as used in particle physics, the metric has an eigenvalue on the time-like subspace, and its mirroring eigenvalue on the space-like subspace. In the specific case of the Minkowski metric,

$$ds^2 = c^2 dt^2 - dx^2 - dy^2 - dz^2,$$

the metric signature is $(1, 3, 0)^+$ or (+, −, −, −) if its eigenvalue is defined in the time direction, or $(1, 3, 0)^-$ or (−, +, +, +) if the eigenvalue is defined in the three spatial directions x, y and z. (Sometimes the opposite sign convention is used, but with the one given here s directly measures proper time.)

== Signature change ==
If a metric is regular everywhere then the signature of the metric is constant. However if one allows for metrics that are degenerate or discontinuous on some hypersurfaces, then signature of the metric may change at these surfaces. Such signature changing metrics may possibly have applications in cosmology and quantum gravity.

== See also ==
- Pseudo-Riemannian manifold
- Sign convention
