= Nullity theorem =

The nullity theorem is a mathematical theorem about the inverse of a partitioned matrix, which states that the nullity of a block in a matrix equals the nullity of the complementary block in its inverse matrix. Here, the nullity is the dimension of the kernel. The theorem was proven in an abstract setting by Gustafson (1984), and for matrices by (Fiedler & Markham 1986).

Partition a matrix and its inverse in four submatrices:

$$\begin{bmatrix} A & B \\ C & D \end{bmatrix}^{-1} = \begin{bmatrix} E & F \\ G & H \end{bmatrix}.$$

The partition on the right-hand side should be the transpose of the partition on the left-hand side, in the sense that if A is an m-by-n block then E should be an n-by-m block.

The statement of the nullity theorem is now that the nullities of the blocks on the right equal the nullities of the blocks on the left (Strang & Nguyen 2004):

$$\begin{align}
\operatorname{nullity} \, A &= \operatorname{nullity} \, H, \\
\operatorname{nullity} \, B &= \operatorname{nullity} \, F, \\
\operatorname{nullity} \, C &= \operatorname{nullity} \, G, \\
\operatorname{nullity} \, D &= \operatorname{nullity} \, E.
\end{align}$$

More generally, if a submatrix is formed from the rows with indices {i_{1}, i_{2}, …, i_{m}} and the columns with indices {j_{1}, j_{2}, …, j_{n}}, then the complementary submatrix is formed from the rows with indices {1, 2, …, N} \ {j_{1}, j_{2}, …, j_{n}} and the columns with indices {1, 2, …, N} \ {i_{1}, i_{2}, …, i_{m}}, where N is the size of the whole matrix. The nullity theorem states that the nullity of any submatrix equals the nullity of the complementary submatrix of the inverse.
