= Cyclic subspace =

Concept in linear algebra

In mathematics, in linear algebra and functional analysis, a cyclic subspace is a certain special subspace of a vector space associated with a vector in the vector space and a linear transformation of the vector space. The cyclic subspace associated with a vector v in a vector space V and a linear transformation T of V is called the T-cyclic subspace generated by v. The concept of a cyclic subspace is a basic component in the formulation of the cyclic decomposition theorem in linear algebra.

== Definition ==
Let $T:V\rightarrow V$ be a linear transformation of a vector space $V$ and let $v$ be a vector in $V$. The $T$-cyclic subspace of $V$ generated by $v$, denoted $Z(v;T)$, is the subspace of $V$ generated by the set of vectors $\{ v, T(v), T^2(v), \ldots, T^r(v), \ldots\}$. In the case when $V$ is a topological vector space, $v$ is called a cyclic vector for $T$ if $Z(v;T)$ is dense in $V$. For the particular case of finite-dimensional spaces, this is equivalent to saying that $Z(v;T)$ is the whole space $V$.

There is another equivalent definition of cyclic spaces. Let $T:V\rightarrow V$ be a linear transformation of a topological vector space over a field $F$ and $v$ be a vector in $V$. The set of all vectors of the form $g(T)v$, where $g(x)$ is a polynomial in the ring $F[x]$ of all polynomials in $x$ over $F$, is the $T$-cyclic subspace generated by $v$.

The subspace $Z(v;T)$ is an invariant subspace for $T$, in the sense that $T Z(v;T) \subset Z(v;T)$.

=== Examples ===
1. For any vector space $V$ and any linear operator $T$ on $V$, the $T$-cyclic subspace generated by the zero vector is the zero-subspace of $V$.
2. If $I$ is the identity operator then every $I$-cyclic subspace is one-dimensional.
3. $Z(v;T)$ is one-dimensional if and only if $v$ is a characteristic vector (eigenvector) of $T$.
4. Let $V$ be the two-dimensional vector space and let $T$ be the linear operator on $V$ represented by the matrix
  $$\begin{bmatrix} 0&1\\ 0&0\end{bmatrix}$$
  relative to the standard ordered basis of $V$. Let
  $$v=\begin{bmatrix} 0 \\ 1 \end{bmatrix}$$
  . Then
  $$Tv = \begin{bmatrix} 1 \\ 0 \end{bmatrix}, \quad T^2v=0,  \ldots, T^rv=0, \ldots$$
  . Therefore
  $$\{ v, T(v), T^2(v), \ldots, T^r(v), \ldots\} = \left\{ \begin{bmatrix} 0 \\ 1 \end{bmatrix}, \begin{bmatrix} 1 \\ 0 \end{bmatrix} \right\}$$
  and so $Z(v;T)=V$. Thus $v$ is a cyclic vector for $T$.

== Companion matrix ==
Let $T:V\rightarrow V$ be a linear transformation of a $n$-dimensional vector space $V$ over a field $F$ and $v$ be a cyclic vector for $T$. Then the vectors

$$B=\{v_1=v, v_2=Tv, v_3=T^2v, \ldots v_n = T^{n-1}v\}$$

form an ordered basis for $V$. Let the characteristic polynomial for $T$ be

$$p(x)=c_0+c_1x+c_2x^2+\cdots + c_{n-1}x^{n-1}+x^n$$.

Then

$$\begin{align}
Tv_1 & = v_2\\
Tv_2 & = v_3\\
Tv_3 & = v_4\\
\vdots & \\
Tv_{n-1} & = v_n\\
Tv_n &= -c_0v_1 -c_1v_2 - \cdots c_{n-1}v_n
\end{align}$$

Therefore, relative to the ordered basis $B$, the operator $T$ is represented by the matrix

$$\begin{bmatrix}
0 & 0 & 0 & \cdots & 0 & -c_0 \\
1 & 0 & 0 & \ldots & 0 & -c_1 \\
0 & 1 & 0 & \ldots  & 0 & -c_2 \\
\vdots & & & & & \\
0 & 0 & 0 & \ldots & 1 & -c_{n-1}
\end{bmatrix}$$

This matrix is called the companion matrix of the polynomial $p(x)$.

== See also ==
- Companion matrix
- Krylov subspace
