= Partial inverse of a matrix =

== Definition ==
In linear algebra and statistics, the partial inverse of a matrix is an operation related to Gaussian elimination which has applications in numerical analysis, statistics and physics. It is also known by various authors as the principal pivot transform, or as the sweep, gyration, or exchange operator, represented by $\mathrm{inv}_k$ if restricted to blocks along the main diagonal, or by $\hat{Y}_{k\ell}$ if considering the general case of any arbitrary block from the matrix.

Given an $n \times n$ matrix $A$ over a vector space $V$ partitioned into blocks:

$$A = \begin{pmatrix} A_{11} & A_{12} \\ A_{21} & A_{22} \end{pmatrix}$$

If $A_{11}$ is invertible, then the partial inverse of $A$ around the pivot block $A_{11}$ is created by inverting $A_{11}$, putting the Schur complement $A / A_{11}$ in place of $A_{22}$, and adjusting the off-diagonal elements accordingly:

$$\operatorname{inv}_1 A = \begin{pmatrix} (A_{11})^{-1} & - (A_{11})^{-1} A_{12} \\ A_{21}  (A_{11})^{-1} & A_{22} - A_{21}  (A_{11})^{-1}A_{12} \end{pmatrix}$$

Conceptually, partial inversion corresponds to a rotation of the graph of the matrix $(X, AX) \in V \times V$, such that, for conformally-partitioned column matrices $(x_1, x_2)^T$ and $(y_1, y_2)^T$:

$$A \begin{pmatrix} x_1 \\ x_2 \end{pmatrix} = \begin{pmatrix} y_1 \\ y_2 \end{pmatrix} \Leftrightarrow
\operatorname{inv}_1(A) \begin{pmatrix} y_1 \\ x_2 \end{pmatrix} = \begin{pmatrix} x_1 \\ y_2 \end{pmatrix}$$

As defined this way, this operator is its own inverse: $\operatorname{inv}_k(\operatorname{inv}_k(A)) = A$, and if the pivot block $A_{11}$ is chosen to be the entire matrix, then the transform simply gives the matrix inverse $A^{-1}$. Note that some authors define a related operation (under one of the other names) which is not an inverse per se; particularly, one common definition instead has $(\operatorname{inv}_k)^2 (A) = -A$.

The transform is often presented as a pivot around a single non-zero element $a_{kk}$, in which case one has

$$\left[ \operatorname{inv}_k (A) \right]_{ij} = \begin{cases}
\frac{1}{a_{kk}} & i = j = k \\
-\frac{a_{kj}}{a_{kk}} & i = k, j \neq k \\
\frac{a_{ik}}{a_{kk}} & i \neq k, j = k \\
a_{ij} - \frac{a_{ik} a_{kj}}{a_{kk}} & i \neq k, j \neq k
\end{cases}$$

== Properties ==
=== Restricted Partial Inversion ===
Restricted partial inverses obey a number of nice properties:

- inversions around different blocks commute, so larger pivots may be built up from sequences of smaller ones.
- partial inversion preserves the space of symmetric matrices.
- partial inversion over a block of size 1 along the main diagonal of a matrix can be expressed in terms of a composition of an identity operator, a commutator operator and a special commutator that resembles the Yang-Baxter equation.

=== General Partial Inversion ===
The general partial inversion group $Z(n)$ of generators $\hat{Y}_{k\ell}$ that act on objects of size $n$ is a non-Abelian group, since it is a composition of the symmetric group $S(n)$, which is non-Abelian, with the restricted partial inversion group $V(n)$ (which is Abelian) . $Z(n)$ admits representations of the dihedral group and the unitary group.

$Z(n) = V(n) \times S(n)$

==== Commutators ====
It was suggested in that a composition $\hat{Y}_{ik}\hat{Y}_{j\ell}$ only commutes if their row indices are different and their column indices are also different:

$\text{[} \hat{Y}_{ik}, \hat{Y}_{j\ell} \text{]} =0 \quad \text{iff} \quad i \neq j \quad \mathrm{and}\quad k \neq \ell.$

The Yang-Baxter equation $ABA = BAB$ occurs as a constraint of generators of $Z(n)$, by introducing the substitutions

$$\begin{align}
A =\hat{Y}_{i-1,i},
\\B= \hat{Y}_{i+1,i}.
\end{align}$$

==== Dihedral Group Representation ====
Compositions of matrix inverse along the main diagonal, $\hat{y}_1$ and a generalized inverse along the secondary diagonal $\hat{y}_2$ form a representation of the dihedral group, $D(n)$:

$$\begin{align}
\hat{y}_1 &= \prod_{k=1}^{n} \mathrm{inv}_k,
\\ \hat{y}_2 &= \prod_{k=1}^{n}\hat{Y}_{k,n-k+1},
\\ \hat{y}_3  &:= \hat{y}_1\hat{y}_2 = \hat{J},
\\ \text{[}\hat{y}_k,\, \hat{y}_\ell\text{]} &= 0, \quad \mathrm{with} \quad  k,\ell \in \{1,2,3\},
\end{align}$$

where $\hat{J}$ is a similarity transformation made of the reverse permutation matrix.

In three dimensions, the dihedral group $D(3)$ over a matrix $M$ is represented in terms of the identity $\hat{I}$ operator and the generators $\hat{y}_1,\hat{y}_2,\hat{y}_3$ as

$$\begin{align}
\hat{I}M &= M,
\\ \hat{y}_1 M &= \mathrm{inv}_3\,\mathrm{inv}_2\, \mathrm{inv}_1M = \hat{Y}_{33}\hat{Y}_{22}\hat{Y}_{11}M,
\\ \hat{y}_2 M &= \hat{Y}_{31}\hat{Y}_{22}\hat{Y}_{13}M,
\\ \hat{y}_3 M  &=
\begin{pmatrix}
0&0&1
\\0&1&0
\\1&0&0
\end{pmatrix}M
\begin{pmatrix}
0&0&1
\\0&1&0
\\1&0&0
\end{pmatrix}.
\end{align}$$

==== Additional Properties ====
- A sequence of partial inversions and matrix powers defines the graph operation of Renormalized Growth, where the dimension of the matrix is kept constant, while the graph that represents it is interpreted to grow.

== Applications ==
=== Physics ===
In S-matrix theory and pseudo-unitary quantum mechanics, partial inversion is used to map S-matrices to T-matrices, and, consequently, unitary matrices to Z-pseudo-unitary matrices.

=== Numerical Analysis ===
Use of the partial inverse in numerical analysis is due to the fact that there is some flexibility in the choices of pivots, allowing for non-invertible elements to be avoided, and because the operation of rotation (of the graph of the pivoted matrix) has better numerical stability than the shearing operation which is implicitly performed by Gaussian elimination. Use in statistics is due to the fact that the resulting matrix nicely decomposes into blocks which have useful meanings in the context of linear regression.
