= Matrix congruence =

Mathematical equivalence between matrices

In mathematics, two square matrices $A$ and $B$ over a field are called congruent if there exists an invertible matrix $P$ over the same field such that

$P^{\mathsf{T}} AP = B$

Matrix congruence arises when considering the effect of change of basis on the Gram matrix attached to a bilinear form or quadratic form on a finite-dimensional vector space: two matrices are congruent if and only if they represent the same bilinear form with respect to different bases.

Halmos defines congruence in terms of conjugate transpose (with respect to a complex inner product space) rather than transpose, but this definition has not been adopted by most other authors.

== Congruence over the reals ==
Sylvester's law of inertia states that two congruent symmetric matrices with real entries have the same numbers of positive, negative, and zero eigenvalues. That is, the number of eigenvalues of each sign is an invariant of the associated quadratic form.

== See also ==
- Congruence relation
- Matrix similarity
- Matrix equivalence
