= Orthogonal complement =

Concept in linear algebra

In the mathematical fields of linear algebra and functional analysis, the orthogonal complement of a subspace $W$ of a vector space $V$ equipped with a bilinear form $B$ is the set $W^\perp$ of all vectors in $V$ that are orthogonal to every vector in $W$. Informally, it is called the perp, short for perpendicular complement. It is a subspace of $V$.

== Example ==
Let $V = (\R^5, \langle \cdot, \cdot \rangle)$ be the vector space equipped with the usual dot product $\langle \cdot, \cdot \rangle$ (thus making it an inner product space), and let
$$W = \{\mathbf{u} \in V: \mathbf{A}x = \mathbf{u},\ x\in \R^2\},$$
with
$$\mathbf{A} = \begin{pmatrix}
1 & 0\\
0 & 1\\
2 & 6\\
3 & 9\\
5 & 3\\
\end{pmatrix}.$$
then its orthogonal complement
$$W^\perp = \{\mathbf{v}\in V:\langle \mathbf{u},\mathbf{v}\rangle = 0 \ \ \forall \ \mathbf{u} \in W\}$$
can also be defined as
$$W^\perp = \{\mathbf{v} \in V: \mathbf{\tilde{A}}y = \mathbf{v},\ y \in \R^3\},$$
being
$$\mathbf{\tilde{A}} =
\begin{pmatrix}
-2 & -3 & -5 \\
-6 & -9 & -3 \\
1 & 0 & 0 \\
0 & 1 & 0 \\
0 & 0 & 1
\end{pmatrix}.$$

The fact that every column vector in $\mathbf{A}$ is orthogonal to every column vector in $\mathbf{\tilde{A}}$ can be checked by direct computation. The fact that the spans of these vectors are orthogonal then follows by bilinearity of the dot product. Finally, the fact that these spaces are orthogonal complements follows from the dimension relationships given below.

== General bilinear forms ==
Let $V$ be a vector space over a field $\mathbb{F}$ equipped with a bilinear form $B.$ We define $\mathbf{u}$ to be left-orthogonal to $\mathbf{v}$, and $\mathbf{v}$ to be right-orthogonal to $\mathbf{u}$, when $B(\mathbf{u},\mathbf{v}) = 0.$ For a subset $W$ of $V,$ define the left-orthogonal complement $W^\perp$ to be
$$W^\perp = \left\{ \mathbf{x} \in V : B(\mathbf{x}, \mathbf{y}) = 0 \ \ \forall \ \mathbf{y} \in W \right\}.$$

There is a corresponding definition of the right-orthogonal complement. For a reflexive bilinear form, where $B(\mathbf{u},\mathbf{v}) = 0 \implies B(\mathbf{v},\mathbf{u}) = 0 \ \ \forall \ \mathbf{u} , \mathbf{v} \in V$, the left and right complements coincide. This will be the case if $B$ is a symmetric or an alternating form.

The definition extends to a bilinear form on a free module over a commutative ring, and to a sesquilinear form extended to include any free module over a commutative ring with conjugation.

=== Properties ===
- An orthogonal complement is a subspace of $V$;
- If $X \subseteq Y$ then $X^\perp \supseteq Y^\perp$;
- The radical $V^\perp$ of $V$ is a subspace of every orthogonal complement;
- $W \subseteq (W^\perp)^\perp$;
- If $B$ is non-degenerate and $V$ is finite-dimensional, then $\dim(W)+\dim (W^\perp)=\dim (V)$.
- If $L_1, \ldots, L_r$ are subspaces of a finite-dimensional space $V$ and $L_* = L_1 \cap \cdots \cap L_r,$ then $L_*^\perp = L_1^\perp + \cdots + L_r^\perp$.

== Inner product spaces ==
This section considers orthogonal complements in an inner product space $H$.

Two vectors $\mathbf{x}$ and $\mathbf{y}$ are called orthogonal if $\langle \mathbf{x}, \mathbf{y} \rangle = 0$, which happens if and only if $\| \mathbf{x} \| \le \| \mathbf{x} + s\mathbf{y} \| \ \forall$ scalars $s$.

If $C$ is any subset of an inner product space $H$ then its orthogonal complement in $H$ is the vector subspace
$$\begin{align}
C^\perp
:&= \{\mathbf{x} \in H : \langle \mathbf{x}, \mathbf{c} \rangle = 0 \ \ \forall \ \mathbf{c} \in C\} \\
&= \{\mathbf{x} \in H : \langle \mathbf{c}, \mathbf{x} \rangle = 0 \ \ \forall \ \mathbf{c} \in C\}
\end{align}$$
which is always a closed subset (hence, a closed vector subspace) of $H$ (Note: If $C = \varnothing$ then $C^{\bot} = H,$ which is closed in $H$ so assume $C \neq \varnothing.$ Let $P := \prod_{c \in C} \mathbb{F}$ where $\mathbb{F}$ is the underlying scalar field of $H$ and define $L : H \to P$ by $L(h) := \left(\langle h, c \rangle\right)_{c \in C},$ which is continuous because this is true of each of its coordinates $h \mapsto \langle h, c \rangle.$ Then $C^{\bot} = L^{-1}(0) = L^{-1}\left(\{ 0 \}\right)$ is closed in $H$ because $\{ 0 \}$ is closed in $P$ and $L : H \to P$ is continuous. If $\langle \,\cdot\,, \,\cdot\, \rangle$ is linear in its first (respectively, its second) coordinate then $L : H \to P$ is a linear map (resp. an antilinear map); either way, its kernel $\operatorname{ker} L = L^{-1}(0) = C^{\bot}$ is a vector subspace of $H.$ Q.E.D.) that satisfies:

- $C^{\bot} = \left(\operatorname{cl}_H \left(\operatorname{span} C\right)\right)^{\bot}$;
- $C^{\bot} \cap \operatorname{cl}_H \left(\operatorname{span} C\right) = \{ 0 \}$;
- $C^{\bot} \cap \left(\operatorname{span} C\right) = \{ 0 \}$;
- $C \subseteq \left(C^{\bot}\right)^{\bot}$;
- $\operatorname{cl}_H \left(\operatorname{span} C\right) \subseteq \left(C^{\bot}\right)^{\bot}$.

If $C$ is a vector subspace of an inner product space $H$ then
$$C^{\bot} = \left\{\mathbf{x} \in H : \|\mathbf{x}\| \leq \|\mathbf{x} + \mathbf{c}\| \ \ \forall \ \mathbf{c} \in C \right\}.$$
If $C$ is a closed vector subspace of a Hilbert space $H$ then
$$H = C \oplus C^{\bot} \qquad \text{ and } \qquad \left(C^{\bot}\right)^{\bot} = C$$
where $H = C \oplus C^{\bot}$ is called the orthogonal decomposition of $H$ into $C$ and $C^{\bot}$ and it indicates that $C$ is a complemented subspace of $H$ with complement $C^{\bot}.$

=== Properties ===
The orthogonal complement is always closed in the metric topology. In finite-dimensional spaces, that is merely an instance of the fact that all subspaces of a vector space are closed. In infinite-dimensional Hilbert spaces, some subspaces are not closed, but all orthogonal complements are closed. If $W$ is a vector subspace of a Hilbert space the orthogonal complement of the orthogonal complement of $W$ is the closure of $W,$ that is,
$$\left(W^\bot\right)^\bot = \overline W.$$

Some other useful properties that always hold are the following. Let $H$ be a Hilbert space and let $X$ and $Y$ be linear subspaces. Then:

- $X^\bot = \overline{X}^{\bot}$;
- if $Y \subseteq X$ then $X^\bot \subseteq Y^\bot$;
- $X \cap X^\bot = \{ 0 \}$;
- $X \subseteq (X^\bot)^\bot$;
- if $X$ is a closed linear subspace of $H$ then $(X^\bot)^\bot = X$;
- if $X$ is a closed linear subspace of $H$ then $H = X \oplus X^\bot,$ the (inner) direct sum.

The orthogonal complement generalizes to the annihilator, and gives a Galois connection on subsets of the inner product space, with associated closure operator the topological closure of the span.

=== Finite dimensions ===
For a finite-dimensional inner product space of dimension $n$, the orthogonal complement of a $k$-dimensional subspace is an $(n-k)$-dimensional subspace, and the double orthogonal complement is the original subspace:
$$\left(W^{\bot}\right)^{\bot} = W.$$

If $\mathbf{A} \in \mathbb{M}_{mn}$, where $\mathcal{R}(\mathbf{A})$, $\mathcal{C} (\mathbf{A})$, and $\mathcal{N} (\mathbf{A})$ refer to the row space, column space, and null space of $\mathbf{A}$ (respectively), then
$$\left(\mathcal{R} (\mathbf{A}) \right)^{\bot} = \mathcal{N} (\mathbf{A}) \qquad \text{ and } \qquad \left(\mathcal{C} (\mathbf{A}) \right)^{\bot} = \mathcal{N} (\mathbf{A}^{\operatorname{T}}).$$

== Banach spaces ==
There is a natural analog of this notion in general Banach spaces. In this case one defines the orthogonal complement of $W$ to be a subspace of the dual of $V$ defined similarly as the annihilator
$$W^\bot = \left\{ x\in V^* : \forall y\in W, x(y) = 0 \right\}.$$

It is always a closed subspace of $V^*$. There is also an analog of the double complement property. $W^{\perp \perp}$ is now a subspace of $V^{**}$(which is not identical to $V$). However, the reflexive spaces have a natural isomorphism $i$ between $V$ and $V^{**}$. In this case we have
$$i\overline{W} = W^{\perp\perp}.$$

This is a rather straightforward consequence of the Hahn–Banach theorem.

== Applications ==
In special relativity the orthogonal complement is used to determine the simultaneous hyperplane at a point of a world line. The bilinear form $\eta$ used in Minkowski space determines a pseudo-Euclidean space of events. The origin and all events on the light cone are self-orthogonal. When a time event and a space event evaluate to zero under the bilinear form, then they are hyperbolic-orthogonal. This terminology stems from the use of conjugate hyperbolas in the pseudo-Euclidean plane: conjugate diameters of these hyperbolas are hyperbolic-orthogonal.

== See also ==
- Complemented lattice – Bound lattice in which every element has a complement
- Complemented subspace
- Hilbert projection theorem – On closed convex subsets in Hilbert space
- Orthogonal projection – Idempotent linear transformation from a vector space to itself

== Bibliography ==
- Adkins, William A.; Weintraub, Steven H. (1992), Algebra: An Approach via Module Theory, Graduate Texts in Mathematics, vol. 136, Springer-Verlag, ISBN 3-540-97839-9, Zbl 0768.00003
- Halmos, Paul R. (1974), Finite-dimensional vector spaces, Undergraduate Texts in Mathematics, Berlin, New York: Springer-Verlag, ISBN 978-0-387-90093-3, Zbl 0288.15002
- Milnor, J.; Husemoller, D. (1973), Symmetric Bilinear Forms, Ergebnisse der Mathematik und ihrer Grenzgebiete, vol. 73, Springer-Verlag, ISBN 3-540-06009-X, Zbl 0292.10016
- Rudin, Walter (1991). Functional Analysis. International Series in Pure and Applied Mathematics. Vol. 8 (Second ed.). New York, NY: McGraw-Hill Science/Engineering/Math. ISBN 978-0-07-054236-5. OCLC 21163277.
