= Elementary matrix =

Matrix which differs from the identity matrix by one elementary row operation

In mathematics, an elementary matrix is a square matrix obtained from the application of a single elementary row operation to the identity matrix. The elementary matrices generate the general linear group GL_{n}(F) when F is a field. Left multiplication (pre-multiplication) by an elementary matrix represents the corresponding elementary row operation, while right multiplication (post-multiplication) represents the corresponding elementary column operation.

Elementary row operations are used in Gaussian elimination to reduce a matrix to row echelon form. They are also used in Gauss–Jordan elimination to further reduce the matrix to reduced row echelon form.

== Elementary row operations ==
There are three types of elementary matrices, which correspond to three types of row operations (respectively, column operations):

Row switching
A row within the matrix can be switched with another row. This corresponds to interchanging the two linear equations.
$$R_i \leftrightarrow R_j$$

Row multiplication
Each element in a row can be multiplied by a non-zero constant. It is also known as scaling a row. This corresponds to multiplying all terms of a linear equation by a non-zero constant.
$$kR_i \rightarrow R_i,\ \mbox{where } k \neq 0$$

Row addition
A row can be replaced by the sum of that row and a multiple of another row. This corresponds to adding two equivalent expressions at once.
$$R_i + kR_j \rightarrow R_i, \mbox{where } i \neq j$$

If E is an elementary matrix, as described below, to apply the elementary row operation to a matrix A, one multiplies A by the elementary matrix on the left, EA. The elementary matrix for any row operation is obtained by executing the operation on the identity matrix. This fact can be understood as an instance of the Yoneda lemma applied to the category of matrices.

=== Row-switching transformations ===
The first type of row operation on a matrix A switches all matrix elements on row i with their counterparts on a different row j. The corresponding elementary matrix is obtained by swapping row i and row j of the identity matrix.

$$T_{i,j} = \begin{bmatrix}
1 &        &   &        &   &        &   \\
& \ddots &   &        &   &        &   \\
&        & 0 &        & 1 &        &   \\
&        &   & \ddots &   &        &   \\
&        & 1 &        & 0 &        &   \\
&        &   &        &   & \ddots &   \\
&        &   &        &   &        & 1
\end{bmatrix}$$

So T_{i,j} A is the matrix produced by exchanging row i and row j of A.

Coefficient wise, the matrix T_{i,j} is defined by :

$$[T_{i,j}]_{k,l} =
\begin{cases}
0 & k \neq i, k \neq j ,k \neq l \\
1 & k \neq i, k \neq j, k = l\\
0 & k = i, l \neq j\\
1 & k = i, l = j\\
0 & k = j, l \neq i\\
1 & k = j, l = i\\
\end{cases}$$

==== Properties ====
- The inverse of this matrix is itself: $T_{i,j}^{-1} = T_{i,j}.$
- Since the determinant of the identity matrix is unity, $\det(T_{i,j}) = -1.$ It follows that for any square matrix A (of the correct size), we have $\det(T_{i,j}A) = -\det(A).$
- For theoretical considerations, the row-switching transformation can be obtained from row-addition and row-multiplication transformations introduced below because $T_{i,j}=D_i(-1)\,L_{i,j}(-1)\,L_{j,i}(1)\,L_{i,j}(-1).$

=== Row-multiplying transformations ===
The next type of row operation on a matrix A multiplies all elements on row i by m where m is a non-zero scalar (usually a real number). The corresponding elementary matrix is a diagonal matrix, with diagonal entries 1 everywhere except in the ith position, where it is m.

$$D_i(m) = \begin{bmatrix}
1 &        &   &   &   &        &   \\
& \ddots &   &   &   &        &   \\
&        & 1 &   &   &        &   \\
&        &   & m &   &        &   \\
&        &   &   & 1 &        &   \\
&        &   &   &   & \ddots &   \\
&        &   &   &   &        & 1
\end{bmatrix}$$

So D_{i}(m)A is the matrix produced from A by multiplying row i by m.

Coefficient wise, the D_{i}(m) matrix is defined by :

$$[D_i(m)]_{k,l} = \begin{cases}
0 & k \neq l \\
1 & k = l, k \neq i \\
m & k = l, k= i
\end{cases}$$

==== Properties ====
- The inverse of this matrix is given by $D_i(m)^{-1} = D_i \left(\tfrac 1 m \right).$
- The matrix and its inverse are diagonal matrices.
- $\det(D_i(m)) = m.$ Therefore, for a square matrix A (of the correct size), we have $\det(D_i(m)A) = m\det(A).$

=== Row-addition transformations ===
The final type of row operation on a matrix A adds row j multiplied by a scalar m to row i. The corresponding elementary matrix is the identity matrix but with an m in the (i, j) position.

$$L_{ij}(m) = \begin{bmatrix}
1 &        &   &        &   &        &   \\
& \ddots &   &        &   &        &   \\
&        & 1 &        &   &        &   \\
&        &   & \ddots &   &        &   \\
&        & m &        & 1 &        &   \\
&        &   &        &   & \ddots &   \\
&        &   &        &   &        & 1
\end{bmatrix}$$

So L_{ij}(m)A is the matrix produced from A by adding m times row j to row i. And A L_{ij}(m) is the matrix produced from A by adding m times column i to column j.

Coefficient wise, the matrix L_{i,j}(m) is defined by :

$$[L_{i,j}(m)]_{k,l} = \begin{cases}
0 & k \neq l, k \neq i, l \neq j \\
1 & k = l \\
m & k = i, l = j
\end{cases}$$

==== Properties ====
- These transformations are a kind of shear mapping, also known as a transvections.
- The inverse of this matrix is given by $L_{ij}(m)^{-1} = L_{ij}(-m).$
- The matrix and its inverse are triangular matrices.
- $\det(L_{ij}(m)) = 1.$ Therefore, for a square matrix A (of the correct size) we have $\det(L_{ij}(m)A) = \det(A).$
- Row-addition transforms satisfy the Steinberg relations.

== See also ==
- Gaussian elimination
- Linear algebra
- System of linear equations
- Matrix (mathematics)
- LU decomposition
- Frobenius matrix
