= Michael P. Drazin =

British mathematician (1929–2026)

Michael Drazin
- Born: 5 June 1929; London, England
- Died: 29 October 2026 (aged 97); West Lafayette, Indiana, US
- Education: University of Cambridge
- Known for: Drazin inverse
- Awards: Smith's Prize (1952)
- Scientific career
- Workplaces: Purdue University
- Thesis: Contributions to Abstract Algebra (1953)
- Doctoral advisor: Robert Rankin and David Rees

Michael Peter Drazin (5 June 1929 – 29 October 2026) was a British and American mathematician, working in noncommutative algebra.

== Background ==
The Drazins (Дразин) were a Russian Jewish family who moved to the United Kingdom in the years before World War I. Isaac Drazin founded in 1927 a well-known electrical goods shop in Heath Street, Hampstead, which existed for over 50 years.

Isaac Drazin married Leah Wexler, and had three sons, of whom Michael was the eldest, and Philip Drazin, also a mathematician, was the youngest, the middle son being David; and died 1 January 1993.

== Early life, education and career ==
Michael Drazin was born in London on 5 June 1929. His younger brother Philip was educated as a boarder at St Christopher School, Letchworth during World War II. The self-published memoirs of Roger Atkinson, a school friend of Michael (Mike), indicate that Drazin attended King Alfred School, London, located in Hampstead, retaining contacts at the school when it was evacuated in wartime to Royston, Hertfordshire; Atkinson was a boarder at St Christopher School, Letchworth from September 1942. In 1946 Atkinson and Drazin visited Paris together.

Drazin was a student at the University of Cambridge, graduating B.A. in 1950 and M.A. in 1953. He was awarded a Ph.D. in 1953 for a dissertation Contributions to Abstract Algebra written with advisers Robert Rankin and David Rees. He was a Fellow of Trinity College, Cambridge from 1952 to 1956, during that period relocating to the United States.

In the academic year 1957–1958 Drazin was Visiting Lecturer at Northwestern University. In 1958 he began a period at RIAS Inc. (the Research Institute for Advanced Studies) in Baltimore as senior scientist, after which he took a position as associate professor at Purdue University in 1962.

== Death ==
Drazin died in West Lafayette, Indiana, on 29 October 2026, at the age of 97.

== Works ==
Drazin gave his name to a type of generalized inverse in ring theory and semigroup theory he introduced in 1958, now known as the Drazin inverse. It was later extended to contexts in operator theory.

While at RIAS, Drazin worked with Emilie Virginia Haynsworth, then at the National Bureau of Standards, within its numerical analysis program. He also worked with the metallurgist Henry Martin Otte of RIAS, and they published a book of crystallographic tables.

== See also ==
- *-regular semigroup
