= Gabor Herman =

Computer programmer

Gabor Tamas Herman is a Hungarian-American professor of computer science. He is an Emeritus Professor of Computer Science at The Graduate Center, City University of New York (CUNY), where he was Distinguished Professor until 2017. He is known for his work on computerized tomography. He is a fellow of the Institute of Electrical and Electronics Engineers (IEEE).

== Early life and education ==
Herman studied mathematics at the University of London, receiving his B.Sc. in 1963 and M.Sc. in 1964. In 1966, he received his M.S. in electrical engineering from the University of California, Berkeley, and in 1968 his Ph.D. in mathematics from the University of London.

== Career ==
In 1969, Herman joined the department of computer science at State University of New York at Buffalo as an assistant professor. He became an associate professor in 1970 and a full professor in 1974. In 1976, he formed the Medical Image Processing Group. In 1980, he published the first edition of Reconstruction from Projections, his textbook on computerized tomography.

Herman moved the Medical Image Processing Group to the University of Pennsylvania in 1981. He was a professor in the radiology department from 1981 to 2000. In 1991, he was elected fellow of the IEEE. The citation reads: "For contributions to medical imagine [sic], particularly in the theory and development of techniques for the reconstruction and display of computed tomographic images". In 1997, he was elected fellow of the American Institute for Medical and Biological Engineering. The citation reads: "For development implementation and evaluation of methods of reconstruction and 3D display of human organs based on transmitted or emitted radiation."

In 2001, Herman joined the faculty of CUNY as Distinguished Professor in the department of computer science, holding that position until his retirement in 2017. The second edition of his computerized tomography textbook, now titled Fundamentals of Computerized Tomography, was published in 2009.

== Scientific Work ==
Together with Frank Natterer, he initiated in 1980 the series of conferences on "Mathematical Methods in Tomography“ at the Mathematical Research Institute of Oberwolfach, Germany. During 1992-4 he was the Editor-in-Chief of the IEEE Transactions on Medical Imaging.

In recent years he has been involved with research on the superiorization methodology.

== Awards and honors ==
- 1989 Honorary member – American Society of Neuroimaging
- 1991 Fellow - Institute of Electrical and Electronics Engineers
- 1996 Fellow – American Institute for Medical and Biological Engineering
- 2001 Hewlett Packard Visiting Research Professor, Mathematical Sciences Research Institute, Berkeley, California

== Bibliography ==
His books include

- 3D Imaging in Medicine (CRC, 1991 and 2000),
- Geometry of Digital Spaces (Birkhauser, 1998),
- Discrete Tomography: Foundations, Algorithms and Applications (Birkhauser, 1999),
- Advances in Discrete Tomography and Its Applications (Birkhauser, 2007),
- Fundamentals of Computerized Tomography: Image Reconstruction from Projections (Springer, 2009) and
- Computational Methods for Three-Dimensional Microscopy Reconstruction (Birkhäuser Basel, 2014).

== Personal life ==
Herman is married to artist Marilyn Kirsch.
