= Haynsworth inertia additivity formula =

Counts positive, negative, and zero eigenvalues of a block partitioned Hermitian matrix

In mathematics, the Haynsworth inertia additivity formula, discovered by Emilie Virginia Haynsworth (1916–1985), concerns the number of positive, negative, and zero eigenvalues of a Hermitian matrix and of block matrices into which it is partitioned.

The inertia of a Hermitian matrix H is defined as the ordered triple

$$\mathrm{In}(H) = \left( \pi(H), \nu(H), \delta(H) \right)$$

whose components are respectively the numbers of positive, negative, and zero eigenvalues of H. Haynsworth considered a partitioned Hermitian matrix

$$H = \begin{bmatrix} H_{11} & H_{12} \\  H_{12}^\ast & H_{22} \end{bmatrix}$$

where H_{11} is nonsingular and H_{12}^{*} is the conjugate transpose of H_{12}. The formula states:

$$\mathrm{In} \begin{bmatrix} H_{11} & H_{12} \\  H_{12}^\ast & H_{22} \end{bmatrix} = \mathrm{In}(H_{11}) + \mathrm{In}(H/H_{11})$$

where H/H_{11} is the Schur complement of H_{11} in H:

$$H/H_{11} = H_{22} - H_{12}^\ast H_{11}^{-1}H_{12}.$$

== Generalization ==
If H_{11} is singular, we can still define the generalized Schur complement, using the Moore–Penrose inverse $H_{11}^+$ instead of $H_{11}^{-1}$.

The formula does not hold if H_{11} is singular. However, a generalization has been proven in 1974 by Carlson, Haynsworth and Markham, to the effect that $\pi(H) \ge \pi(H_{11}) + \pi(H/H_{11})$ and $\nu(H) \ge \nu(H_{11}) + \nu(H/H_{11})$.

Carlson, Haynsworth and Markham also gave sufficient and necessary conditions for equality to hold.

== See also ==
- Block matrix pseudoinverse
- Sylvester's law of inertia
