= Briggs–Bers criterion =

In stability theory, the Briggs–Bers criterion is a criterion for determining whether the trivial solution to a linear partial differential equation with constant coefficients is stable, convectively unstable or absolutely unstable. This is often useful in applied mathematics, especially in fluid dynamics, because linear PDEs often govern small perturbations to a system, and we are interested in whether such perturbations grow or decay. The Briggs–Bers criterion is named after R. J. Briggs and A. Bers.

Suppose that the PDE is of the form $Ly=0$, where $y = y(x,t)$ is a function of space and time($x$ and $t$). The partial differential operator $L=L(\partial_x,\partial_t)$ has constant coefficients, which do not depend on $x$ and $t$. Then a suitable ansatz for $y$ is the normal mode solution

$$y=\hat{y} \exp(ikx-i\omega t).$$

Making this ansatz is equivalent to considering the problem in Fourier space – the solution may be decomposed into its Fourier components in space and time. Making this ansatz, the equation becomes

$$L(ik,-i\omega)\hat{y} \exp(ikx-i\omega t) = 0;$$

or, more simply,

$$L(ik,-i\omega) = 0.$$

This is a dispersion relation between $k$ and $\omega$, and tells us how each Fourier component evolves in time. In general, the dispersion relation may be very complicated, and there may be multiple $\omega$ which satisfy the relation for a given value of $k$, or vice versa. The solutions to the dispersion relation may be complex-valued.

Now, an initial condition $y(x,0)$ can be written as a superposition of Fourier modes of the form $\exp(ikx)$. In practice, the initial condition will have components of all frequencies. Each of these components evolves according to the dispersion relation, and therefore the solution at a later time $y(x,t)$ may be obtained by Fourier inversion. In the simple case where $L$ is first-order in time, the dispersion relation determines a unique value of $\omega(k)$ for each given value of $k$, and so

$$y(x,t) = \frac{1}{2\pi} \int \hat{y}(k) \exp(ikx-i\omega(k)t) \, dk$$

where

$$\hat{y}(k) = \int y(x,0) \exp(-ikx) \, dx$$

is the Fourier transform of the initial condition. In the more general case, the Fourier inversion must be performed by contour integration in the complex $k$ and $\omega$ planes.

While it may not be possible to evaluate the integrals explicitly, asymptotic properties of $y(x,t)$ as $t\rightarrow\infty$ may be obtained from the integral expression, using methods such as the method of stationary phase or the method of steepest descent. In particular, we can determine whether $y(x,t)$ decays or grows exponentially in time, by considering the largest value that $\Im\omega$ may take. If the dispersion relation is such that $\Im\omega<0$ always, then any solution will decay as $t\rightarrow\infty$, and the trivial solution $y=0$ is stable. If there is some mode with $\Im\omega>0$, then that mode grows exponentially in time. By considering modes with zero group velocity and determining whether they grow or decay, we can determine whether an initial condition which is localised around $x=0$ moves away from $x=0$ as it grows, with $y(0,t)\rightarrow 0$ (convective instability); or whether $y(0,t)\rightarrow\infty$ (absolute instability).

== Transient growth ==
Suppose the PDE is of the form

$$y_t = A y$$

where $A$ is a linear differential operator in $x$. In general, $A$ is not a normal operator. While the large-time behaviour of $y$ is still determined by the eigenvalues of $A$, the behaviour which takes place before this large-time behaviour may be dramatically different.

In particular, while the eigenvalues of $A$ may all have negative real part, which would predict that $y$ decays exponentially at large times and that the trivial state $y=0$ is stable, it is possible for $y$ to grow transiently and become large before decaying. In practice, the linear equations that we work with are linearisations of more complicated governing equations such as the Navier–Stokes equations about some base state, with the linearisations carried out under the assumption that the perturbation quantity $y$ is small. Transient growth may violate this assumption. When nonlinear effects are considered, then a system may be unstable even if the linearised system is stable.

== Generalisation ==
When the coefficients of $L$ vary with $x$, then this criterion is no longer applicable. However, if the variation is very slow, then the WKBJ approximation may be used to derive a leading-order approximation to the solution. This gives rise to the theory of global modes, which was first developed by Philip Drazin in 1974.
