= Adi Ben-Israel =

Mathematician and engineer

Adi Ben-Israel (born November 6, 1933) is a mathematician and an engineer, working in applied mathematics, optimization, statistics, operations research and other areas. His last position was Professor of Operations Research and Mathematics at Rutgers University, New Jersey. He is now retired.

== Research topics ==
Ben-Israel's research has included generalized inverses of matrices, in particular the Moore–Penrose pseudoinverse, and of operators, their extremal properties, computation and applications. as well as local inverses of nonlinear mappings. In the area of linear algebra, he studied the matrix volume and its applications, basic, approximate and least-norm solutions, and the geometry of subspaces. He wrote about ordered incidence geometry and the geometric foundations of convexity.

In the topic of iterative methods, he published papers about the Newton method for systems of equations with rectangular or singular Jacobians, directional Newton methods, the quasi-Halley method, Newton and Halley methods for complex roots, and the inverse Newton transform.

Ben-Israel's research into optimization included linear programming, a Newtonian bracketing method of convex minimization, input optimization, and risk modeling of dynamic programming, and the calculus of variations. He also studied various aspects of clustering and location theory, and investigated decisions under uncertainty.

== Publications ==
Books

- Generalized Inverses: Theory and Applications, with T.N.E. Greville, J. Wiley, New York, 1974
- Optimality in Nonlinear Programming: A Feasible Directions Approach, with A. Ben-Tal and S. Zlobec, J. Wiley, New York, 1981
- Mathematik mit DERIVE (German), with W. Koepf and R.P. Gilbert, Vieweg-Verlag, Berlin, ISBN 3-528-06549-4, 1993
- Computer Supported Calculus: With MACSYMA, with R.P. Gilbert, Springer-Verlag, Vienna, ISBN 3-211-82924-5, 2001
- Generalized Inverses: Theory and Applications (2nd edition), with T.N.E. Greville, Springer-Verlag, New York, ISBN 0-387-00293-6, 2003

Selected articles

- Contributions to the theory of generalized inverses, J. Soc. Indust. Appl. Math. 11(1963), 667–699, (with A. Charnes)
- A Newton–Raphson method for the solution of systems of equations, J. Math. Anal. Appl. 15(1966), 243–252
- Linear equations and inequalities on finite-dimensional, real or complex, vector spaces: A unified theory, J. Math. Anal. Appl. 27(1969), 367–389
- Ordered incidence geometry and the geometric foundations of convexity theory, J. Geometry 30(1987), 103–122, (with A. Ben-Tal)
- Input optimization for infinite horizon discounted programs, J. Optimiz. Th. Appl. 61(1989), 347–357, (with S.D. Flaam)
- Certainty equivalents and information measures: Duality and extremal principles, J. Math. Anal. Appl. 157(1991), 211–236 (with A. Ben-Tal and M. Teboulle).
- A volume associated with mxn matrices, Lin. Algeb. and Appl. 167(1992), 87–111.
- The Moore of the Moore–Penrose inverse, Electron. J. Lin. Algeb. 9(2002), 150–157.
- The Newton bracketing method for convex minimization, Comput. Optimiz. and Appl. 21(2002), 213–229 (with Y. Levin).
- An inverse Newton transform, Contemporary Math. 568(2012), 27–40.
- A concentrated Cauchy distribution with finite moments, Annals of Oper. Res. (to appear)
