= Group inverse =

In mathematics, group inverse may refer to:

- the inverse element in a group or in a subgroup of another, not necessarily group structure, e.g. in a subgroup of a semigroup
- the Drazin inverse
