= Guorong Wang =

Chinese mathematician

- Born: 1940 (age 85–86)
- Occupation: Mathematician
- Employer: Shanghai Normal University
- Known for: Work in generalized inverses of matrices; Professor and first Dean of Mathematics & Science College, Shanghai Normal University

Guorong Wang (Chinese: 王国荣; born 1940) is a Chinese mathematician, working in the area of generalized inverses of matrices. He is a Professor and first Dean of Mathematics & Science College of Shanghai Normal University, Shanghai, China.

== Research ==
Wang has been conducting teaching and research in generalized inverses of matrices since 1976. He taught "Generalized Inverses of Matrices" and held many seminars for graduate students majoring in Computational Mathematics in Math department of Shanghail Normal University. Since 1979, he and his students have obtained a number of results on generalized inverses in the areas of perturbation theory, condition numbers, recursive algorithms, finite algorithms, imbedding algorithms, parallel algorithms, generalized inverses of rank-r modified matrices and Hessenberg matrices, extensions of the Cramer rules and the representation and approximation of generalized inverses of linear operators. More than 100 papers are published in refereed journals in China and other countries, including 25 papers in SCI journals such as LAA, AMC etc. His two monographs in generalized inverses, one in Chinese and the other in English, have been adopted by several universities as textbooks or references books for graduate students.

== Publications ==
- Introduction to Matrix Computations, (Chinese Translation with others, original author G.W. Stewart), Shanghai Science and Technology Publishing House, 1980
- An Introduction to Numerical Analysis, (Chinese Translation with Jiaoxun Kuang and others, original author K. E. Atkinson), Shanghai Science and Technology Publishing House, 1985
- Generalized Inverses of Matrices and Operators, (In Chinese, Author), Science Press, 1994, 1998
- College Mathematics (1), (In Chinese, Editor), East-China Normal University Press, 2001
- College Mathematics (2), (In Chinese, Editor), East-China Normal University Press, 2002
- Generalized Inverses: Theory and Computations, (In English, Author with Yimin Wei & Sanzheng Qiao), Science Press, 2004, 2018 & Springer, 2018
- Numerical Analysis, (Chinese Translation with others, original authors D. Kincaid & W. Cheney), China Machinery Industry Press, 2005
- Applied Numerical Linear Algebra, (Chinese Translation, original author J. Demmel), Posts & Telecom Press, 2007
- Elementary Numerical Analysis, (Chinese Translation with others, original authors K. E. Atkinson & W. Han), Posts & Telecom Press, 2009
