= NNLS =

NNLS may refer to

- Non-negative least squares, an optimization problem in mathematics
- New North London Synagogue, see Sternberg Centre
