= Drazin inverse =

Concept in mathmatics

In mathematics, the Drazin inverse, named after Michael P. Drazin, is a kind of generalized inverse of a matrix.

Let A be a square matrix. The index of A is the least nonnegative integer k such that rank(A^{k+1}) = rank(A^{k}). The Drazin inverse of A is the unique matrix A^{D} that satisfies

$$A^{k+1}A^\text{D} = A^k,\quad A^\text{D}AA^\text{D} = A^\text{D},\quad AA^\text{D} = A^\text{D}A.$$

It's not a generalized inverse in the classical sense, since $A A^\text{D} A \neq A$ in general.

- If A is invertible with inverse $A^{-1}$, then $A^\text{D} = A^{-1}$.
- If A is a block diagonal matrix

$$A = \begin{bmatrix}
B & 0   \\
0   & N
\end{bmatrix}$$

where $B$ is invertible with inverse $B^{-1}$ and $N$ is a nilpotent matrix, then

$$A^D = \begin{bmatrix}
B^{-1} & 0   \\
0   & 0
\end{bmatrix}$$

- Drazin inversion is preserved by conjugation. If $A^\text{D}$ is the Drazin inverse of $A$, then $P A^\text{D} P^{-1}$ is the Drazin inverse of $PAP^{-1}$.
- The Drazin inverse of a matrix of index 0 or 1 is called the group inverse or {1,2,5}-inverse and denoted A^{#}. The group inverse can be defined, equivalently, by the properties AA^{#}A = A, A^{#}AA^{#} = A^{#}, and AA^{#} = A^{#}A.
- A projection matrix P, defined as a matrix such that P^{2} = P, has index 1 (or 0) and has Drazin inverse P^{D} = P.
- If A is a nilpotent matrix (for example a shift matrix), then $A^\text{D} = 0.$

The hyper-power sequence is

$A_{i+1} := A_i + A_i\left(I - A A_i\right);$ for convergence notice that $A_{i+j} = A_i \sum_{k=0}^{2^j-1} \left(I - A A_i\right)^k.$

For $A_0 := \alpha A$ or any regular $A_0$ with $A_0 A = A A_0$ chosen such that $\left\|A_0 - A_0 A A_0\right\| < \left\|A_0\right\|$ the sequence tends to its Drazin inverse,

$$A_i \rightarrow A^\text{D}.$$

== Drazin inverses in categories ==
A study of Drazin inverses via category-theoretic techniques, and a notion of Drazin inverse for a morphism of a category, has been recently initiated by Cockett, Pacaud Lemay and Srinivasan. This notion is a generalization of the linear algebraic one, as there is a suitably defined category $\mathsf{MAT}$ having morphisms matrices $M : \mathbb C^n\to \mathbb C^m$ with complex entries; a Drazin inverse for the matrix M amounts to a Drazin inverse for the corresponding morphism in $\mathsf{MAT}$.

== Jordan normal form and Jordan-Chevalley decomposition ==
As the definition of the Drazin inverse is invariant under matrix conjugations, writing $A = P J P^{-1}$, where J is in Jordan normal form, implies that $A^\text{D} = P J^\text{D} P^{-1}$. The Drazin inverse is then the operation that maps invertible Jordan blocks to their inverses, and nilpotent Jordan blocks to zero.

More generally, we may define the Drazin inverse over any perfect field, by using the Jordan-Chevalley decomposition $A = A_s + A_n$ where $A_s$ is semisimple and $A_n$ is nilpotent and both operators commute. The two terms can be block diagonalized with blocks corresponding to the kernel and cokernel of $A_s$. The Drazin inverse in the same basis is then defined to be zero on the kernel of $A_s$, and equal to the inverse of $A$ on the cokernel of $A_s$.

== See also ==
- Constrained generalized inverse
- Inverse element
- Moore–Penrose inverse
- Jordan normal form
- Generalized eigenvector
