= Global mode =

In the physics of hydrodynamics, a global mode of a system is one in which the system executes coherent oscillations in time. Suppose a quantity $y(x,t)$ which depends on space $x$ and time $t$ is governed by some partial differential equation which does not have an explicit dependence on $t$. Then a global mode is a solution of this PDE of the form $y(x,t) = \hat{y}(x) e^{i\omega t}$, for some frequency $\omega$. If $\omega$ is complex, then the imaginary part corresponds to the mode exhibiting exponential growth or exponential decay.

The concept of a global mode can be compared to that of a normal mode; the PDE may be thought of as a dynamical system of infinitely many equations coupled together. Global modes are used in the stability analysis of hydrodynamical systems. Philip Drazin introduced the concept of a global mode in his 1974 paper, and gave a technique for finding the normal modes of a linear PDE problem in which the coefficients or geometry vary slowly in $x$. This technique is based on the WKBJ approximation, which is a special case of multiple-scale analysis. His method extends the Briggs–Bers technique, which gives a stability analysis for linear PDEs with constant coefficients.

== In practice ==
Since Drazin's 1974 paper, other authors have studied more realistic problems in fluid dynamics using a global mode analysis. Such problems are often highly nonlinear, and attempts to analyse them have often relied on laboratory or numerical experiment. Examples of global modes in practice include the oscillatory wakes produced when fluid flows past an object, such as a vortex street.
