= Thomas N. E. Greville =

American mathematician (1910–1998)

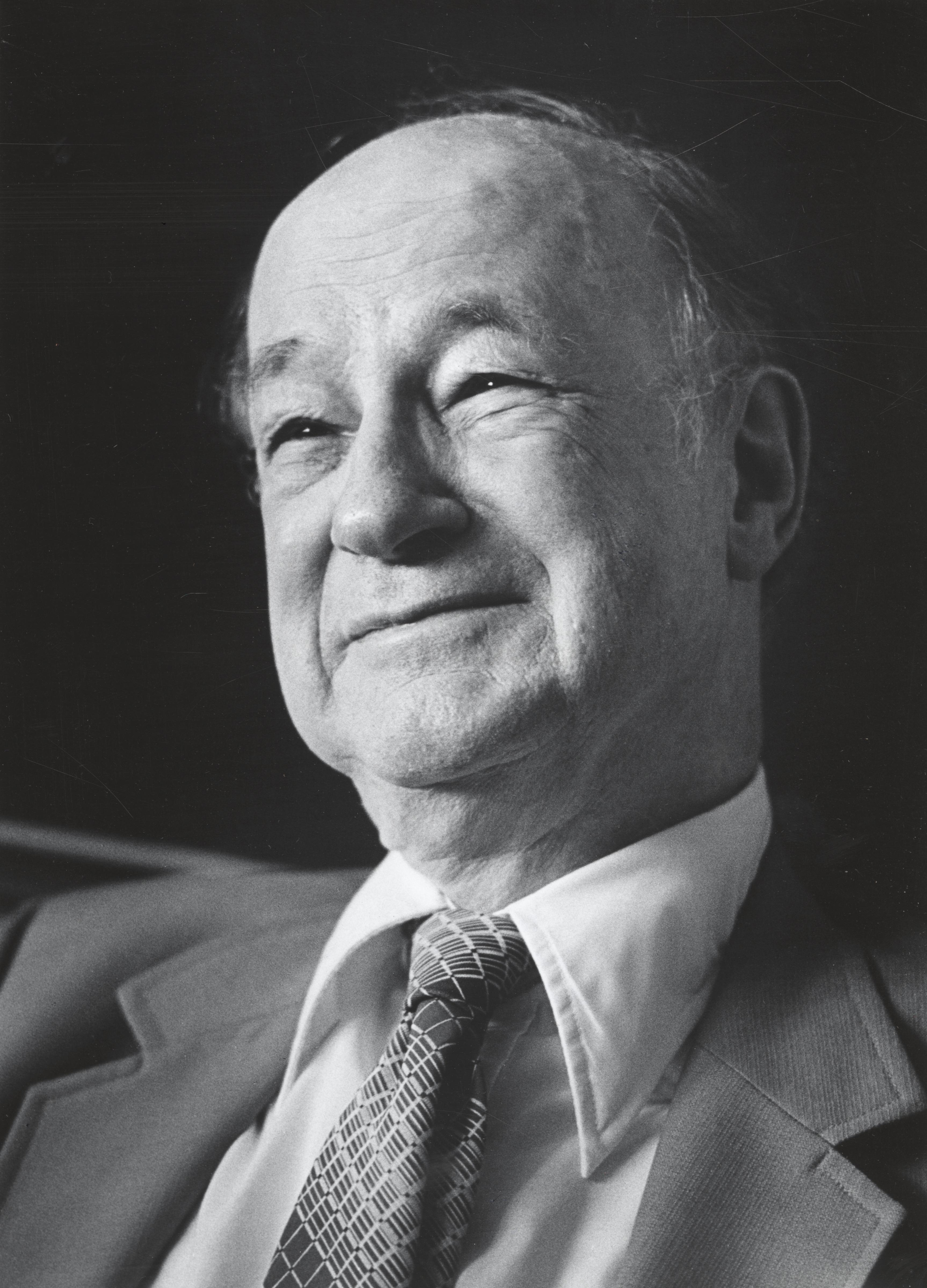

Thomas Nall Eden Greville (December 27, 1910 – 1998) was an American mathematician, specializing in statistical analysis, particularly as it concerned the experimental investigation of psi.

== Biography/Career ==
Greville was born in New York on December 27, 1910, and died in 1998. Following receipt of a B.A. degree from the University of the South (Sewanee, Tennessee) in 1930, and a M.A. degree in 1932, he received a Ph.D. from the University of Michigan in 1933. His Ph.D. thesis concerned Invariance of the Property of Admissibility Under Certain General Types of Transformations. Thereafter Greville worked as actuarial assistant in the company Acacia Mutual Life Insurance (1933–37); instructor in mathematics at the University of Michigan (1937–40); actuarial mathematician in the U.S. Bureau of the Census (1940–46); chief of the Actuarial Analysis section of the National Office of Vital Statistics (1946–52); statistical consultant to the U.S. Operations Mission to Brazil (1952–54); assistant chief actuary, U.S. Social Security Administration (1954–58); chief mathematician in the Office of the Quartermaster General (1958–61); vice-president of the S.A. Millar Company, Washington, D.C. (1961–62); and visiting professor within the Mathematics Research Center of the U.S. Army in 1962. From 1963 to 1985, he worked as a mathematics Professor at the Mathematics Research Center at the University of Wisconsin–Madison.

Greville was a member of the American Mathematical Society; the Society for Industrial and Applied Mathematics; the Society of Actuaries; the Institute of Mathematical Statistics; the American Statistical Association; and the Parapsychological Association. He served as editor of the Journal of the Society for Industrial and Applied Mathematics, and as statistical editor for the Journal of Parapsychology. In 1960 he was elected as a Fellow of the American Statistical Association.

He lived in Charlottesville, Virginia, US.

== Contributions ==
Greville is mainly credited with providing a general method for analyzing data from forced-choice matching experiments, in a way that is sensitive to different ways of sampling the alternatives that are matched, how likely it is that each alternative will be sampled (which can be unequal), and the number of responses that are matched to the target set. His method – known as the Greville method – essentially provides a mathematically consistent means of obtaining the expected mean and variance of matching two or more samples of a limited set of alternatives, under any of the possible combinations of these conditions. He proposed his method particularly in the context of the 1930s controversy on the proper analysis of tests in extrasensory perception, and, accordingly, his method has been often, if not mostly, applied within the field of parapsychology.

== Key publications ==
- Greville, T. N. E. (1938). Exact probabilities for the matching hypothesis. Journal of Parapsychology, 2, 55–59.
- Greville, T. N. E. (1938). ESP and mathematics. [Paper presented at the APA symposium on "Methods in ESP Research," Columbus, Ohio, September 9, 1938]. Journal of Parapsychology, 2, 248–252.
- Greville, T. N. E. (1941). The frequency distribution of a general matching problem. Annals of Mathematical Statistics, 12, 350–354.
- Greville, T. N. E. (1943). Frequency of distributions of ESP scores for certain call patterns. Journal of Parapsychology, 7, 272–276.
- Greville, T. N. E. (1944). On multiple matching with one variable deck. Annals of Mathematical Statistics, 15, 432–434.
- Greville, T. N. E. (1949). On the number of sets required for testing the significance of verbal material. Journal of Parapsychology, 13, 137–138.
- Greville, T. N. E. (1951). A method of evaluating the reinforcement effect. Journal of Parapsychology, 15, 118–121.
- Greville, T. N. E. (1954). A reappraisal of the mathematical evaluation of the reinforcement effect. Journal of Parapsychology, 18, 178–183.
- Greville, T. N. (1980). Are psi events random? Journal of the American Society for Psychical Research, 74, 223–226.

== Works about ==
1. Adi Ben-Israel, Thomas N.E. Greville: Generalized Inverses. ISBN 0-387-00293-6, Springer-Verlag (2003)
2. D. S. Meek, R. G. Stanton (Editors): Selected papers of T. N. E. Greville. Charles Babbage Research Centre, Winnipeg, Manitoba, Canada (1984)
