= Marilyn Kirsch =

American artist (born 1950)

- Born: 1950 (age 75–76); Lowell, Massachusetts
- Education: School of the Museum of Fine Arts at Tufts
- Known for: Painting, Photography
- Style: Lyrical Abstraction

Marilyn Kirsch (born 1950 in Lowell, Massachusetts) is an American artist, known for abstract and non-objective paintings often described as Lyrical Abstraction.

== Work ==
Kirsch received her MFA from the School of the Museum of Fine Arts at Tufts in 1976. As an alumna of the School of the Museum of Fine Arts at Tufts, her "Imaginary Travel" series of photo-collages was featured in the Fall 2012 issue of Tufts Magazine. During her years in Boston she exhibited her work at the Nielsen Gallery in Boston as part of the exhibition "Contemporary Drawings for the Young Collector".

Kirsch moved to New York City in 1976 and began to exhibit her work there. Her artwork was included in a group exhibition at the Bertha Urdang Gallery. Kirsch's drawings were selected for the Contemporary Drawing/New York exhibition exhibition at the University of California, Santa Barbara curated by Phyllis Plous.

At this point in her career Kirsch's work often included visual references, although subtle and abstract, to classical architectural imagery.

In 1984 she moved to Philadelphia where she exhibited her work at various venues. Her work was selected for the regional survey of abstract painting, "Abstract Strategies" at the Philadelphia Art Alliance. She also showed regularly at the Jessica Berwind Gallery in Philadelphia. During her years in Philadelphia she had several solo exhibitions outside of Pennsylvania including Iowa City, Iowa.

She returned to New York City in 2003 where she currently works in her Manhattan studio. Since returning to Manhattan Kirsch has continued to exhibit her work in Philadelphia, most notably at the Wexler Gallery. She also exhibits her work in New York and in the surrounding area. Her paintings were included in the "Big Idea" exhibition (January 31- February 25, 2017) at The Painting Center in New York City. The Danish book "Mal for Sjov" (Paint for Fun) includes Marilyn Kirsch as one of three artists presented as an inspiration to children learning about abstract painting. She was one of the artists selected for the 2018 Members Invitational exhibition at the Equity Gallery in New York City's Lower East Side.

In addition to her oil paintings, Kirsch works with photography and photo-collage. Her photographic works were shown at the 2013 LIC Arts Open at the Insite Design Studio in Long Island City, New York. Kirsch's painting and photography were featured in the Spring 2015 issue of diSONARE, a bilingual arts journal both online and in print. Two of her photographs won Honorable Mention in the 2017 NYC4PA competition "Black and White".
