= Philip Drazin =

British mathematician (1934–2002)

Philip Gerald Drazin (25 May 1934 – 10 January 2002) was a British mathematician and a leading international expert in fluid dynamics.

== Biography ==
Drazin was born in East London to Isaac Drazin, who was of Russian-Jewish origin and ran a shop in Hampstead, and Leah Wexler. Drazin went to boarding school at St Christopher School, Letchworth during the Blitz. His older brother Michael is also a mathematician.

Drazin completed his PhD at the University of Cambridge under G. I. Taylor in 1958. He was awarded the Smith's Prize in 1957. After leaving Cambridge, he spent two years at MIT before moving to the University of Bristol, where he stayed and became a Professor until retiring in 1999. After retiring, he lectured at the University of Oxford and the University of Bath until his death in 2002.

Drazin worked on hydrodynamic stability and the transition to turbulence. His 1974 paper On a model of instability of a slowly-varying flow introduced the concept of a global mode solution to a system of partial differential equations such as the Navier-Stokes equations. He also worked on solitons.

In 1998 he was awarded the Symons Gold Medal of the Royal Meteorological Society.

Drazin died at his home in Bristol in 2002.
