= Block matrix pseudoinverse =

Formula for the pseudoinverse of a partitioned matrix

In mathematics, a block matrix pseudoinverse is a formula for the pseudoinverse of a partitioned matrix. This is useful for decomposing or approximating many algorithms updating parameters in signal processing, which are based on the least squares method.

== Derivation ==
Consider a column-wise partitioned matrix:

$$\begin{bmatrix}\mathbf A & \mathbf B\end{bmatrix},\quad
\mathbf A \in \reals^{m \times n},\quad
\mathbf B \in \reals^{m \times p},\quad
m \geq n + p.$$

If the above matrix is full column rank, the Moore–Penrose inverse matrices of it and its transpose are

$$\begin{align}
\begin{bmatrix}\mathbf A & \mathbf B\end{bmatrix}^+ &=
\left(
\begin{bmatrix}\mathbf A & \mathbf B\end{bmatrix}^\textsf{T}
\begin{bmatrix}\mathbf A & \mathbf B\end{bmatrix}
\right)^{-1} \begin{bmatrix}\mathbf A & \mathbf B\end{bmatrix}^\textsf{T}, \\
\begin{bmatrix}
\mathbf A^\textsf{T} \\
\mathbf B^\textsf{T}
\end{bmatrix}^+ &=
\begin{bmatrix}\mathbf A & \mathbf B\end{bmatrix} \left(
\begin{bmatrix}\mathbf A & \mathbf B\end{bmatrix}^\textsf{T}
\begin{bmatrix}\mathbf A & \mathbf B\end{bmatrix}
\right)^{-1}.
\end{align}$$

This computation of the pseudoinverse requires (n + p)-square matrix inversion and does not take advantage of the block form.

To reduce computational costs to n- and p-square matrix inversions and to introduce parallelism, treating the blocks separately, one derives

$$\begin{align}
\begin{bmatrix}\mathbf A & \mathbf B\end{bmatrix}^+ &=
\begin{bmatrix}
\mathbf P_B^\perp \mathbf A\left(\mathbf A^\textsf{T} \mathbf P_B^\perp \mathbf A\right)^{-1} \\
\mathbf P_A^\perp \mathbf B\left(\mathbf B^\textsf{T} \mathbf P_A^\perp \mathbf B\right)^{-1}
\end{bmatrix} =
\begin{bmatrix}
\left(\mathbf P_B^\perp\mathbf A\right)^+ \\
\left(\mathbf P_A^\perp\mathbf B\right)^+
\end{bmatrix}, \\
\begin{bmatrix}
\mathbf A^\textsf{T} \\
\mathbf B^\textsf{T}
\end{bmatrix}^+ &=
\begin{bmatrix}
\mathbf P_B^\perp \mathbf A\left(\mathbf A^\textsf{T} \mathbf P_B^\perp \mathbf A\right)^{-1},\quad
\mathbf P_A^\perp \mathbf B\left(\mathbf B^\textsf{T} \mathbf P_A^\perp \mathbf B\right)^{-1}
\end{bmatrix} =
\begin{bmatrix}
\left(\mathbf A^\textsf{T} \mathbf P_B^\perp\right)^+ &
\left(\mathbf B^\textsf{T} \mathbf P_A^\perp\right)^+
\end{bmatrix},
\end{align}$$

where orthogonal projection matrices are defined by

$$\begin{align}
\mathbf P_A^\perp &= \mathbf I - \mathbf A \left(\mathbf A^\textsf{T} \mathbf A\right)^{-1} \mathbf A^\textsf{T}, \\
\mathbf P_B^\perp &= \mathbf I - \mathbf B \left(\mathbf B^\textsf{T} \mathbf B\right)^{-1} \mathbf B^\textsf{T}.
\end{align}$$

The above formulas are not necessarily valid if
$$\begin{bmatrix}\mathbf A & \mathbf B\end{bmatrix}$$
does not have full rank – for example, if $\mathbf A \neq 0$, then

$$\begin{bmatrix}\mathbf A & \mathbf A\end{bmatrix}^+ =
\frac{1}{2}\begin{bmatrix}
\mathbf A^+ \\
\mathbf A^+
\end{bmatrix} \neq
\begin{bmatrix}
\left(\mathbf P_A^\perp\mathbf A\right)^+ \\
\left(\mathbf P_A^\perp\mathbf A\right)^+
\end{bmatrix} =
0$$

== Application to least squares problems ==
Given the same matrices as above, we consider the following least squares problems, which appear as multiple objective optimizations or constrained problems in signal processing. Eventually, we can implement a parallel algorithm for least squares based on the following results.

=== Column-wise partitioning in over-determined least squares ===
Suppose a solution
$$\mathbf x = \begin{bmatrix}
\mathbf x_1 \\
\mathbf x_2 \\
\end{bmatrix}$$
solves an over-determined system:

$$\begin{bmatrix}
\mathbf A, & \mathbf B
\end{bmatrix}
\begin{bmatrix}
\mathbf x_1 \\
\mathbf x_2 \\
\end{bmatrix} =
\mathbf d,\quad
\mathbf d \in \reals^{m \times 1}.$$

Using the block matrix pseudoinverse, we have

$$\mathbf x =
\begin{bmatrix}
\mathbf A, & \mathbf B
\end{bmatrix}^+\,\mathbf d =
\begin{bmatrix}
\left(\mathbf P_B^\perp \mathbf A\right)^+ \\
\left(\mathbf P_A^\perp \mathbf B\right)^+
\end{bmatrix}\mathbf d.$$

Therefore, we have a decomposed solution:

$$\mathbf x_1 = \left(\mathbf P_B^\perp \mathbf A\right)^+\,\mathbf d,\quad
\mathbf x_2 = \left(\mathbf P_A^\perp \mathbf B\right)^+\,\mathbf d.$$

=== Row-wise partitioning in under-determined least squares ===
Suppose a solution $\mathbf x$ solves an under-determined system:

$$\begin{bmatrix}
\mathbf A^\textsf{T} \\
\mathbf B^\textsf{T}
\end{bmatrix}\mathbf x =
\begin{bmatrix}
\mathbf e \\
\mathbf f
\end{bmatrix},\quad
\mathbf e \in \reals^{n \times 1},\quad
\mathbf f \in \reals^{p \times 1}.$$

The minimum-norm solution is given by

$$\mathbf x =
\begin{bmatrix}
\mathbf A^\textsf{T} \\
\mathbf B^\textsf{T}
\end{bmatrix}^+\,
\begin{bmatrix}
\mathbf e \\
\mathbf f
\end{bmatrix}.$$

Using the block matrix pseudoinverse, we have

$$\mathbf x = \begin{bmatrix}
\left(\mathbf A^\textsf{T}\mathbf P_B^\perp\right)^+ &
\left(\mathbf B^\textsf{T}\mathbf P_A^\perp\right)^+
\end{bmatrix} \begin{bmatrix}
\mathbf e \\
\mathbf f
\end{bmatrix} =
\left(\mathbf A^\textsf{T}\mathbf P_B^\perp\right)^+\,\mathbf e +
\left(\mathbf B^\textsf{T}\mathbf P_A^\perp\right)^+\,\mathbf f.$$

== See also ==
- Invertible matrix § Blockwise inversion
