= Metric projection =

In mathematics, a metric projection is a function that maps each element of a metric space to the set of points nearest to that element in some fixed sub-space.

== Formal definition ==
Formally, let X be a metric space with distance metric d, and let M be a fixed subset of X. Then the metric projection associated with M, denoted p_{M}, is the following set-valued function from X to M:

$p_M(x) = \arg\min_{y\in M} d(x,y)$

Equivalently:

$p_M(x) = \{y \in M : d(x,y) \leq d(x,y') \forall y'\in M \} = \{y \in M : d(x,y) = d(x,M) \}$

The elements in the set $\arg\min_{y\in M} d(x,y)$ are also called elements of best approximation. This term comes from constrained optimization: we want to find an element nearer to x, under the constraint that the solution must be a subset of M. The function p_{M} is also called an operator of best approximation.

== Chebyshev sets ==
In general, p_{M} is set-valued, as for every x, there may be many elements in M that have the same nearest distance to x. In the special case in which p_{M} is single-valued, the set M is called a Chebyshev set. As an example, if (X,d) is a Euclidean space (R^{n} with the Euclidean distance), then a set M is a Chebyshev set if and only if it is closed and convex.

== Continuity ==
If M is non-empty compact set, then the metric projection p_{M} is upper semi-continuous, but might not be lower semi-continuous. But if X is a normed space and M is a finite-dimensional Chebyshev set, then p_{M} is continuous.

Moreover, if X is a Hilbert space and M is closed and convex, then p_{M} is Lipschitz continuous with Lipschitz constant 1.

== Applications ==
Metric projections are used both to investigate theoretical questions in functional analysis and for practical approximation methods. They are also used in constrained optimization.
