= Constrained generalized inverse =

In linear algebra, a constrained generalized inverse is obtained by solving a system of linear equations with an additional constraint that the solution is in a given subspace. One also says that the problem is described by a system of constrained linear equations.

In many practical problems, the solution $x$ of a linear system of equations

$$Ax=b\qquad (\text{with given }A\in\R^{m\times n}\text{ and } b\in\R^m)$$

is acceptable only when it is in a certain linear subspace $L$ of $\R^n$.

In the following, the orthogonal projection on $L$ will be denoted by $P_L$. Constrained system of linear equations

$$Ax=b\qquad x\in L$$

has a solution if and only if the unconstrained system of equations

$$(A P_L) x = b\qquad x\in\R^n$$

is solvable. If the subspace $L$ is a proper subspace of $\R^n$, then the matrix of the unconstrained problem $(A P_L)$ may be singular even if the system matrix $A$ of the constrained problem is invertible (in that case, $m=n$). This means that one needs to use a generalized inverse for the solution of the constrained problem. So, a generalized inverse of $(A P_L)$ is also called a $L$-constrained pseudoinverse of $A$.

An example of a pseudoinverse that can be used for the solution of a constrained problem is the Bott–Duffin inverse of $A$ constrained to $L$, which is defined by the equation

$$A_L^{(-1)}:=P_L(A P_L + P_{L^\perp})^{-1},$$

if the inverse on the right-hand-side exists.
