= Gudaitis =

- Lithuanian surname
- m.: Gudaitis
- f.: (unmarried): Gudaitytė
- f.: (married): Gudaitienė

Gudaitis is a Lithuanian language patronymic surname derived from the nickname Gudas meaning "Belarusian person".

The surname may refer to:

- Aleksandras Gudaitis-Guzevičius (1908–1969), Soviet writer, statesman and NKVD officer
- Alexei Gudaitis, VP of ICT Group (Russia)
- Artūras Gudaitis (born 1993) a Lithuanian basketball player
- Vincas Ramutis Gudaitis (born 1941) a Lithuanian politician

== See also ==
- Gudas (disambiguation)
