= Vincas =

Vincas is a Lithuanian masculine given name.

People named Vincas include:

- Vincas Vičkus (2009-), Lithuanian niche gym tik toker
- Vincas Grybas (1890–1941), Lithuanian sculptor
- Vincas Kudirka (1858-1899), Lithuanian poet and physician, author of the Lithuanian National Anthem
- Vincas Mykolaitis-Putinas (1893–1967), Lithuanian writer
- Vincas Krėvė-Mickevičius (1882–1954), Lithuanian writer, poet, novelist, playwright and philologist
- Vincas Mickevičius-Kapsukas (1880–1935), Lithuanian communist activist
- Vincas Ramutis Gudaitis (born 1941), Lithuanian politician
- Justas Vincas Paleckis (born 1942), Lithuanian ex-communist and politician
