= Determinant =

In mathematics, invariant of square matrices

In mathematics, the determinant is a scalar-valued function of the entries of a square matrix that has many properties which make it fundamental for the study of square matrices and linear transformations represented by them.

The determinant of a matrix A is commonly denoted det(A), det A, or |A|. For square matrices of dimensions two and three, the determinant is explicitly described as
$$\begin{aligned}
\det \begin{bmatrix} a & b\\c & d \end{bmatrix}&= ad-bc,\\[10pt]
\det \begin{bmatrix}
a & b & c \\
d & e & f \\
g & h & i
\end{bmatrix} &= aei + bfg + cdh - ceg - bdi - afh.
\end{aligned}$$

There are several equivalent ways to define the determinant of an $n\times n$ matrix. A simple and conceptual one is as the unique function that maps a product of matrices to a product of scalars and whose value on a triangular matrix is the product of the diagonal entries.

So, the determinant of the product of two square matrices is the product of their determinants. A square matrix is invertible if and only if its determinant has a multiplicative inverse. In the common case where the entries belong to a field, a matrix is invertible if and only if the determinant is nonzero. The adjugate matrix provides an explicit expression of the inverse matrix.

A consequence of the multiplicative property is that two similar matrices have the same determinant, and therefore the determinant of a linear transformation is well defined. For real linear transformations, the value of the determinant is the scale factor by which the transformation alters every volume in the space (positive if the orientation is preserved, negative if the orientation is reversed, zero if the transformation is not bijective).

The determinant is linear with respect to each row and each column of the matrix and is therefore a multilinear function. This means that it is a linear combination of the entries of each row or column of the matrix. Laplace expansion expresses the coefficients of this linear combination as determinants (of one dimension less), called cofactors. Laplace expansion is useful for computing determinants when the rows or columns are very sparse, typically when there are only one or two nonzero entries in a row or column.

Determinants can be efficiently computed with Gaussian elimination and singular value decomposition. Determinants can also be theoretically computed by means of the Leibniz formula or Laplace expansion, but this is inefficient except in special cases.

Determinants occur throughout mathematics. Cramer's rule expresses the solution of a system of linear equations in terms of determinants. The characteristic polynomial of a square matrix, whose roots are the eigenvalues, is defined as a determinant with polynomial entries. In geometry, determinants are used to define or compute areas and volumes, as well as space orientation and collinearity. In analysis, the Jacobian determinant is used for change of variables in multiple integrals and its non-nullity is one of the hypotheses of the implicit function theorem in several variables. In algebraic geometry, the Hessian determinant allows finding inflexion points of an algebraic plane curve.

== Low dimension ==
=== Dimension < 2 ===
Square matrices with less than two rows and two columns are rarely considered per se, but may occur when working with n × n matrices where n is a unspecified natural number.

A 0 × 0 matrix is the empty matrix with 0 row, 0 column and no entries. The usual conventions for the empty set and the empty product imply that the determinant of the empty matrix is 1.

A 1 × 1 matrix has a single entry, and its determinant equals this entry:
$$\det [a] = a$$

An example of the coherency of these conventions is the formula for the inverse matrix of a n × n matrix A with a nonzero determinant $d$: the inverse is the multiplication by $1/d$ of the adjugate matrix of A, which is a n × n matrix whose entries are, up to the sign, determinants of $(n-1)\times (n-1)$ submatrices of A. In the case $n=1$, the single entry of the adjugate matrix is the determinant of the empty matrix, which equals 1. So,
$$[d]^{-1} = \tfrac 1d \,[1] = \left[ \tfrac 1d \right],$$
which is what is expected for 1 × 1 matrices.

=== Two by two matrices ===
The determinant of a 2 × 2 matrix
$$\begin{pmatrix} a & b \\c & d \end{pmatrix}$$
is

$$\det \begin{pmatrix} a & b \\ c & d \end{pmatrix} = \begin{vmatrix} a & b \\ c & d \end{vmatrix} = ad - bc.$$
This simple form allows verifying by direct computation the properties listed in § Properties.

==== Parallelogram area ====
Proof by dissection and rearrangement of the area of the parallelogram.

One of the main uses of 2 × 2 determinants is the computation of the area of the parallelogram defined by two vectors in a Euclidean plane.

In fact, the two column vectors
$$\textstyle\begin{pmatrix} a \\c\end{pmatrix}$$
and
$$\textstyle\begin{pmatrix} b \\d\end{pmatrix}$$
of the matrix
$$\begin{pmatrix} a & b \\ c & d\end{pmatrix}$$
define a parallelogram with vertices $(0,0)$, $(a,c)$, $(b,d)$, and $(a+b,c+d)$. The area of this parallogram is the absolute value of the determinant $ad - bc$ of the matrix. The sign of the determinant determines the relative orientation of the vectors: the determinant is positive if one passes by a counterclockwise rotation from the direction of the vector $(a,c)$ to that of$(b,d)$, and negative if a clockwise rotation is needed (if the vectors are aligned, the determinant is zero). So, the determinant is the signed area of the parallelogram.

The proof that the determinant is the signed area of the parallelogram can be done either with trigonometry or by dissection and rearrangement, as shown in the figure.

=== 3 × 3 matrices ===
By the Leibniz formula for determinants, the determinant of a 3 × 3 matrix is
$$\begin{vmatrix}
a&b&c\\d&e&f\\g&h&i
\end{vmatrix}
= aei + bfg + cdh - ceg - bdi - afh.$$

Rule of Sarrus

The rule of Sarrus is a mnemonic for the expanded form of this determinant: the sum of the products of three diagonal north-west to south-east lines of matrix elements, minus the sum of the products of three diagonal south-west to north-east lines of elements, when the copies of the first two columns of the matrix are written beside it as in the illustration. This scheme for calculating the determinant of a 3 × 3 matrix does not carry over into higher dimensions.

== Definitions ==
The determinant of a square matrix is a scalar uniquely associated to it. Commonly, matrix entries and determinants are real or complex numbers, but, more generally, matrix entries may belong to any commutative ring, in which case the scalars and the determinant belong to this ring. If
$$A = \begin{bmatrix}
a_{1,1} & a_{1,2} & \cdots & a_{1,n} \\
a_{2,1} & a_{2,2} & \cdots & a_{2,n} \\
\vdots &  \vdots & \ddots &  \vdots \\
a_{n,1} & a_{n,2} & \cdots & a_{n,n}
\end{bmatrix}$$
is a square matrix with n rows and n columns, its determinant is denoted $\det(A)$, $\det A$,
$$\begin{vmatrix}
a_{1,1} & a_{1,2} & \cdots & a_{1,n} \\
a_{2,1} & a_{2,2} & \cdots & a_{2,n} \\
\vdots &  \vdots & \ddots &  \vdots \\
a_{n,1} & a_{n,2} & \cdots & a_{n,n}
\end{vmatrix}$$
or
$$\det\begin{bmatrix}
a_{1,1} & a_{1,2} & \cdots & a_{1,n} \\
a_{2,1} & a_{2,2} & \cdots & a_{2,n} \\
\vdots &  \vdots & \ddots &  \vdots \\
a_{n,1} & a_{n,2} & \cdots & a_{n,n}
\end{bmatrix}.$$

There are various equivalent ways to define the determinant of a square matrix A, and it depends on authors which definition is chosen as the primary one, as well as the level of generality. In this article, the definition by the multiplicative property has been chosen as the primary one, because it is simple and does not require specific background.

In this section, the scalars (matrix entries and determinants) are assumed to belong to a field, such as the real or complex numbers. The multiplicative and elementary-transformation characterizations remain valid over an integral domain, but their equivalence requires a different argument, using fraction-free elimination and cancellation rather than ordinary Gaussian elimination. That argument is not given here.

=== By multiplicative property ===
The determinant is the unique function from the square matrices to the scalars that maps a product of matrices of the same size to the product of their determinants, and maps every triangular matrix to the product of their diagonal entries. That is,
$$\det (AB)=\det(A)\det(B)$$
and
$$\begin{vmatrix}
a_{1,1} & a_{1,2} & a_{1,3} & \ldots & a_{1,n} \\
0 & a_{2,2} & a_{2,3} & \ldots &   a_{2,n} \\
\vdots & \ddots  &  \ddots & \ddots &    \vdots \\
0 & \ldots  & 0 & a_{n-1,n-1} & a_{n-1,n} \\
0 & \ldots   &  \ldots  &     0  &   a_{n,n}
\end{vmatrix}
=\begin{vmatrix}
a_{1,1} &     0   &  0     & \ldots  &  0 \\
a_{2,1} & a_{2,2} &  0     &  \ldots &  0 \\
\vdots &  \vdots & \ddots & \ddots &   \vdots \\
a_{n-1,1} & a_{n-1,2} & \ldots & a_{n-1,n-1} & 0\\
a_{n,1} & a_{n,2} & \ldots & a_{n,n-1} & a_{n,n}
\end{vmatrix}
=a_{1,1}\cdots a_{n,n}.$$

Such a definition requires the proof that such a function exists and is unique. This will be a byproduct of the proof of the equivalence with other definitions.

=== By elementary transformations ===
An elementary row transformation is a transformation of a matrix of one of the following types, where $R_i$ denotes the ith row of the matrix:

1. Multiplying one row by a scalar: $R_i\to \lambda R_i$
2. Adding to a row a scalar multiple of another row: $R_i\to R_i +\lambda R_j$
3. Exchanging two rows: $(R_i, R_j)\to (R_j, R_i)$

Elementary column transformations are defined similarly by replacing "row" with "column". Transformations of type 3 may be obtained as a succession of transformations of types 1 and 2: the exchange of rows i and j may be done by the following succession of transformations, where $R_i$ denotes the current ith row (not necessarily the original one):
$$R_i\to R_i+R_j, \qquad R_j\to R_j-R_i, \qquad R_i\to R_i+R_j, \qquad R_j\to -R_j$$

This leads to another definition of determinants:

The determinant is the unique function of the entries of a square matrix such that the determinant of the identity matrix is 1, the transformations of type 1 multiply the determinant by the involved scalar, and the transformations of type 2 do not change the determinant; it follows that the transformations of type 3 multiply the determinant by –1.

For proving that this definition is equivalent to the preceding one, one has to interpret elementary transformations in terms of elementary matrices. In fact, an elementary transformation $R_i\to \lambda R_i$ amounts to left-multiply the matrix by the diagonal matrix with all diagonal elements equal to 1 except the ith that equals $\lambda$. An elementary transformation $R_i\to R_i +\lambda R_j$ amounts to left-multiplication of the matrix by a triangular matrix in which all diagonal entries are equal to 1, the entry in the ith row and the ijth column is equal to $\lambda$, and all other entries are zero.

A determinant function that satisfies the definition by multiplicative properties satisfy the definition by elementary transformations since the identity matrix is a triangular matrix and the other conditions of the latter definition are the restriction of the multiplicative property to the case where the left factor is an elementary matrix.

Conversely, a determinant function that satisfies the definition by elementary transformations satisfies also the other definition. Over a field, Gaussian elimination allows proving that every matrix can be expressed as a product of elementary matrices (provided that zero is allowed as a scalar for the elementary transformations of type 1). So, for proving $\det(A)\,\det(B)=\det (AB)$, it suffices to express A as a product of elementary matrices and apply associative property of matrix product.

Uniqueness of the determinant results also from Gaussian elimination. Indeed, over a field one may transform, by means of elementary transformations, any matrix into a row echelon form, which is a specific triangular matrix. This allows computing the determinant. However, it does not by itself establish that the value obtained is independent of the elimination path or of the elementary matrices, so it does not prove the existence of the determinant. Instead, what it shows is that if two determinant functions are given, then they agree on every such path and therefore are identical. So it remains only to construct a function that satisfies the properties defining the determinant, a task taken up below.

=== By Leibniz formula ===
The Leibniz formula is one of the most common definitions of determinants. It is an explicit expression of a determinant as a multivariate polynomial function of the matrix entries. It also makes sense in a general commutative ring, and does not require it to be a field or integral domain. The proof that it satisfies the preceding definitions implies the required existence proof. Also, per uniqueness in the special case of an integral domain, this proves also the equivalence with the other definitions.

To write the Leibniz formula, one needs permutations and their signatures. That is, the determinant of a matrix
$$\left. A=\big(a_{i,j}\big)\right|_{i=1...n}^{j=1...n}$$
is
$$\det(A)=\sum_{\sigma}\operatorname{sgn}(\sigma)
\prod_{i=1}^n a_{i,\sigma(i)} ,$$
where $\sigma$ runs over all permutations of $\{1,\ldots,n\}$.

When $A=[~]$ is the empty matrix, the usual conventions for the empty set and the empty product give $\det [~] =1$. If $n=1$,one has $\det [a_{1,1}] = a_{1,1}$. Otherwise, the above formula is often expanded as
$$\det(A)=\sum_{\sigma}\operatorname{sgn}(\sigma) a_{1,\sigma(1)}\cdots a_{n,\sigma(n)}.$$

The Levi-Civita symbol allows a variant of the Leibniz formula that is useful in some contexts. It is denoted $\varepsilon_{i_1,\ldots,i_n}$ and defined on the n-tuples $(i_1,\ldots,i_n)$ of integers in $\{1,\ldots,n\}$ as 0 if two of the integers are equal, and otherwise as the signature of the permutation formed by the n-tuple. With the Levi-Civita symbol, the Leibniz formula becomes

$$\det(A) = \sum_{i_1,i_2,\ldots,i_n} \varepsilon_{i_1\cdots i_n} a_{1,i_1} \!\cdots a_{n,i_n},$$

where the sum is taken over all n-tuples of integers in $\{1,\ldots,n\}.$

To prove that the Leibniz formula satisfies the definition of the preceding sections, one proves first that it is an alternating multilinear form that takes the value 1 on the identity matrix (see next section): multilinearity results from the fact that the Leibniz formula is a homogeneous polynomial of degree one in the entries of each column of the matrix; the fact that the form is alternating and takes the value 1 on the identity matrix result from basic properties of permutations. Then, it suffices to applies the results of the next section.

=== As an alternating multilinear form ===
The determinant can be also defined as the unique alternating multilinear form of the columns (or the rows) that takes the value 1 on the identity matrix.

For making this more precise, it is convenient to regard an $n \times n$ matrix A as being composed of its $n$ columns, so denoted as
$$A = \big ( a_1, \dots, a_n \big ),$$
where the column vector $a_i$ (for each i) is composed of the entries of the matrix in the i-th column. Being a multilinear form means that if $A = \big ( a_1, \dots, a_i, \ldots, a_n \big )$ and $A' = \big ( a_1, \dots, a'_i, \ldots, a_n \big )$ are two matrices that differs on one column only, then, for every scalar $r$, one has
$$\det\big ( a_1, \dots, a_i+ra'_i , \ldots, a_n\big ) = \det \big ( a_1, \dots, a_i , \ldots, a_n\big )+ r\det \big ( a_1, \dots, a'_i , \ldots, a_n\big ).$$
The fact that the form is alternating means that it takes the value 0 if two columns are equal.

To prove that this definition is equivalent with the preceding ones, it suffices to verify the properties of the definition by elementary transformations (above), which is straightforward.

=== Over a commutative ring ===
In the preceding definitions, the matrix entries and the determinants have been supposed to belong to a field. The determinant is also defined for matrices with entries in a commutative ring $R$, in which case, the determinant is also an element of $R$. A common example is the Jacobian determinant, where the matrix entries and the determinant are differentiable functions.

The Leibniz formula and the definition as an alternating multilinear form, as well as their equivalence remain valid in this more general case. They imply the properties involved in the definitions by multiplicative property and by elementary transformations.

They imply also a further property, the invariance under ring homomorphisms.That is, if $f: R\to R'$ is a homomorphism of commutative rings, and if $f(M)$ denotes the matrix obtained by applying $f$ to the entries of $M$, then $\det (f(M)) = f(\det (M))$.

Among many other uses (see § Invariance under ring homomorphisms, below), this invariance is used, often implicitly, for proving the uniqueness of the determinant in the general case of commutative rings .

=== Generic determinant ===
A generic matrix is a matrix whose entries are distinct indeterminates. Leibniz formula implies that the determinant of a generic matrix is a polynomial in these indeterminates, with integer coefficients, called a generic determinant. More precisely, if M is an n by n matrix with the $n^2$ indeterminates $X_{1,1}, \cdots, X_{n,n}$ as coefficients, then the entries and the determinant of this matrix belong to the polynomial ring $\Z[X_{1,1}, \cdots, X_{n,n}]$ and thus also to its field of fractions.

A n×n matrix $M$ over a commutative ring $R$ defines a ring homorphism $\varphi_M : \Z[X_{1,1}, \cdots, X_{n,n}] \to R$ that maps each $X_{i,j}$ to the corresponding entry of $M$. By the invariance under ring homomorphisms, $\varphi_M$ maps the generic determinant to $\det(M)$.

So, for proving properties of determinants over a commutative ring $R$ that is not an integral domain, it suffices often to prove it over fields, then, to use the invariance under ring homorphisms to "transfer" it over integral domains, and finally to use $\varphi_M$ to transfer it over $R$.

A property of a generic determinant that is useful in some contexts is that it is an irreducible polynomial (See Determinantal ideal § Properties for a more general property).

== Properties ==
=== Basic rules ===
The properties listed here are parts or immediate consequences of above definitions. They are often used without being referred to explicitly. It follows that it is useful to have them in mind when working with determinants and learning related concepts. In the following list, simple important cases of a property are often listed separately.

- Zero test: A determinant equals zero if
  - all entries of a row or column equal 0,
  - two rows or columns are equal,
  - a row or column is a linear combination of the other rows or columns,
  - a linear combination of rows or columns, with at least one nonzero coefficient, has all its entries equal to zero.
- Immediate computation:
  - The determinant of an identity matrix equals 1.
  - The determinant of a diagonal matrix is the product of its diagonal entries.
  - The determinant of a triangular matrix is the product of its diagonal entries.
- Simple transformations:
  - Interchanging two rows or two columns multiplies the determinant by $-1$
  - Homogeneity: Multiplying a row or column by a scalar multiplies the determinant by the same scalar.
  - A matrix and its transpose have the same determinant.
  - Adding to a row or column the product of a row or column by a scalar does not change the determinant.
  - Adding to a row or column a linear combination of the other rows or columns does not change the determinant.
- Matrix multiplication:
  - The determinant of the product of two matrices is the product of their determinant.
  - Two similar matrices have the same determinant.That is, given two square matrices $A$ and $B$, if there is an invertible matrix $S$ such that $B=S^{-1}AS$, then $\det(B) = \det(A)$.
- Inversibility:
  - Over a field, a matrix is invertible if and only if its determinant is nonzero.
  - Over a commutative ring, a matrix is invertible if and only if its determinant is invertible in the ring. In this case, the entries of the inverse matrix belong also to the ring.
  - In particular, a square matrix of integers has an inverse that is also a matrix of integers if and only if its determinant is $1$ or $-1$.

=== Laplace expansion ===
By Leibniz formula, a determinant is a homogeneous polynomial of degree one in the elements of each row or column. This means that, given a square matrix $A=(a_{i,j})$ of order $n$, one has
$$\det A = \sum_{j=1}^n a_{i,j}A_{i,j},$$
where $A_{i,j}$ is a polynomial in the other entries of the matrix that is called the cofactor of $_{i,j}$. This linear expansion is called the expansion of the determinant along the $i$th row. The expansion of the determinant along the $j$th column is defined similarly.

Laplace expansion provides an explicit expression of the coefficients $A_{i,j}$: one has
$$A_{i,j} = (-1)^{i+j}M_{i,j},$$
where $M_{i,j}$ is the minor of the ith row and the jth column, that is, the determinant of matrix of order $n-1$ obtained by removing the ith row and the jth column of the matrix $A$.

For example, the Laplace expansion along the first row of a 3 by 3 matrix is:
$$\begin{vmatrix}a&b&c\\ d&e&f\\ g&h&i\end{vmatrix} =
a\begin{vmatrix}e&f\\ h&i\end{vmatrix} - b\begin{vmatrix}d&f\\ g&i\end{vmatrix} + c\begin{vmatrix}d&e\\ g&h\end{vmatrix}$$

Laplace expansion can be used iteratively for computing determinants, but this approach is inefficient for large matrices. Indeed a naive implementation requires the computation of $n!$ (factorial of $n$) sub-determinants; if computed determinants are memorized for avoiding to compute them several times, there are nevertheless $2^n-1$ sub-determinants to compute, giving an exponential algorithm, when Gaussian elimination provides a polynomial time algorithm.

However, Laplace expansion nmay be useful for proving by recursion formulas depending of parameters.

Laplace expansion is also often useful for sparse matrices. For example, if $a_{i,j}$ is the unique nonzero entry of its row or of its column, one has
$$\det A = (-1)^{i,j}M_{i,j},$$
where $M_{i,j}$ is the minor obtained by removing the ith row and the jth column of the matrix.

=== Adjugate matrix ===
The adjugate matrix $\operatorname{adj}(A)$ is the transpose of the matrix of the cofactors, that is,

$$(\operatorname{adj}(A))_{i,j} = (-1)^{i+j} M_{ji}.$$

For every matrix, one has

$$(\det A) I = A\operatorname{adj}A = (\operatorname{adj}A)\,A.$$

Thus the adjugate matrix can be used for expressing the inverse of a nonsingular matrix:

$$A^{-1} = \frac 1{\det A}\operatorname{adj}A.$$

=== Invertibility ===
The multiplicative property of the determinant implies that, over every commutative ring, if a matrix is invertible, then its determinant is invertible. Conversely, the formulas in § Adjugate matrix, imply that, if the deteerminant is invertible in a commutative ring that contains the entries of the matrix, then the matrix is invertible in the same ring.

In particular, over a field, a matrix is invertible if and only if its determinant is nonzero.

Also, a matrix of integers is invertible over the integers (that is, the inverse has integer entries), if and only if its determinant is $\pm1$. Such a matrix is called a unimodular matrix.

The invertible matrices n×n matrices over a commutative ring $R$ form a group under multiplication that is called the general linear group and denoted $\operatorname{GL}_n(R)$. The most studied of these groups are $\operatorname{GL}_n(\R)$, $\operatorname{GL}_n(\C)$, and $\operatorname{GL}_n(\Z)$, as well as their normal subgroups formed by the matrices of determinant 1; these groups are called special linear groups and denoted $\operatorname{SL}_n(\R)$, $\operatorname{SL}_n(\C)$, and $\operatorname{SL}_n(\Z)$.

=== Invariance under ring homomorphisms ===
The determinant is invariant under ring homomorphisms in the following sense. Let $f:R\to S$ be a ring homomorphism. For every matrix $M$ with entries in $R$, let denote by $f(M)$ the matrix obtained by applying $f$ to the entries of $M$. The invariance under ring homomorphisms is the relation
$$\det f(M) = f(\det M).$$

When $f$ is an inclusion, this means that the determinant of a matrix with entries in $R$ does not depend whether the entries are considered as belonging to $R$ or $S$. In particular the determinant of a matrix belongs to the smallest ring that contains the entries of the matrix.

The determinant of a matrix of integers is always an integer, and, for computing it, one can use divisions, that is, working over the field $\Q$ of the rational numbers. Even if divisions introduce intermediate values that are not in $\Z$, the final result will be in $\Z$, and will be the same as if the computation would have been done without division.

The invariance applies also when $S=R$ and $f$ is an automorphism. In particular, the determinant of the conjugate of a matrix of complex numbers is the conjugate of the determinant of the matrix.

The invariance allows also using modular arithmetic for efficiently computing a determinant with integer entries. This consists in reducing the entries modulo several prime numbers $p_i$, computing the determinant in each field $\Z/p_i\Z$ (possibly with different methods), and recovering the result with the Chinese remainder theorem.

The invariance under ring homomorphisms can be expressed in terms of category theory as follows. The determinant is a natural transformation between two functors from the category of commutative rings to the category of monoids. The first functor maps each ring to the monoid (under matrix multiplication) of the square matrices of order $n$ with entries in the ring. The second functor is the forgetful functor that maps a ring to its underlying multiplicative monoid.

=== Hadamard bound ===
It is often useful to bound the absolute value of a determinant in terms of the size of the entries of the matrix.

In this section, $A = (a_{i,j})$ denotes an $n\times n$ matrix with complex entries whose absolute values are upper bounded by $B$. The absolute value of its determinant is denoted $\vert \det(A)\vert$.

The triangle inequality applied to Leibniz formula shows that $\vert \det(A)\vert \le n!B^n$. This bound is arely considered because the following bound is always sharper for $n>1$.

Hadamard inequality implies
$$\vert \det(A)\vert \le n^{n/2}B^n.$$

This inequality is often called "Hadamard inequality", but properrly speaking, Hadamard inequality is
$$\vert \det(A)\vert \le \prod_{j=1}^n\|A_j \|,$$
where $\|A_j \|$ is the quadratic norm of the jth column of A, that is,
$$\|A_i \| = \sqrt{|a_{1,j}|^2 +\cdots +|a_{n,j}|^2}.$$

The inequality becomes an equality if and only if the columns are pairwise orthogonal, that is, if $\textstyle\sum_{i=1}^n a_{i,j}a_{i,k}=0,$ for $j\ne k$.

Hadamard inequality is the algebraic counterpart of the following theorem of Euclidean geometry: the volume of the parallelotope defined by n vectors in an n-dimensional Euclidean vector space is at most the product of the lengths of the vectors, and the equality holds if and only if the vectors are pairwise ortogonal.

If the matrix $A$ is positive definite, Hadamard inequality implies that the determinant is upperbounded by the product of the entries of the main diagonal; that is,
$$\det(A) \le \prod_{i=1}^n a_{i,i}.$$
(No absolute value is needed here, since the determinant of a positive definite matrix and its diagonal enties are all real and positive.)

This inequality is sometimes also called the Hadamard inequality.

== Other determinants ==
There are several types of mathematical objects that can be represented by square matrices. This allows defining a determinant on these objects.

=== Determinant of an endomorphism ===
An endomorphism of a finite-dimensional vector space is commonly represented on a given basis by a square matrix. Two square matrices $A$ and $B$ represent the same endomorphism on different bases if and only if they are similar, that is, if there is an invertible matrix $S$ such that
$$B=S^{-1} AS.$$
This implies, by the multiplicative property of determinants, that
$$\det(B)=\det(A).$$

This allows defining the determinant of an endomorphism as the determinant of the matrix that represents the endomorphism on any basis. Indeed, this determinant does not depend on the basis chosen for representing the endomorphism by a matrix.

=== Determinant of n vectors ===
Consider n vectors in a vector space of dimension n. If a basis of the vector space is given, the coordinates of each vector may form a column matrix of n rows. Putting these column matrices together, one gets a square matrix.

The determinant of the $n$ vectors is the determinant of this matrix. As this determinant depends on the choice of a basis, one must use the wording determinant of the $n$ vectors on the given basis in contexts where several bases may be considered.

In the case of a Euclidean vector space (a vector space over the real numbers), one considers generally only orthonormal bases. In this case the determinant of $n$ vectors does not depend on the choice of a specific orthonormal basis, and the phrase "the determinant of $n$ vectors" refers generally to the determinant of the vectors on an orthonormal basis.

=== Discriminant of a quadratic form ===
A quadratic form over a field F is a homogeneous polynomial of degree 2. It can be naturally represented by a square matrix. The discriminant of the quadratic form is the determinant of this matrix. It is defined only up to the multiplication by a square. This means that the discriminant is an element of the multiplicative monoid $F/(F^\times )^2$, where $(F^\times )^2$ denotes the set of the nonzero squares in $F$.

== Derivative ==
Let $A=(a_{i,j})$ be a square matrix whose entries are differentiable functions of an independent variable $x$. Since, by Leibniz formula, $\det(A)$ is a polynomial function of the entries of $A$, the determinant is a differentiable function of $x$. Its derivative may be expressed with Jacobi's formula as

$$\frac{d}{dx} \det(A) = \operatorname{tr}\left(\operatorname{adj}(A) \frac{d A}{d x}\right),$$

where $\operatorname{tr}$ denotes the trace of a matrix (the sum of its diagonal entries), $\operatorname{adj}(A)$ denotes the adjugate of $A$, and $\textstyle \frac{d A}{d x}$ denotes the derivative of the matrix, that is the matrix of the derivatives of the entries of $A$.

In particular, if $A$ is invertible, one has

$$\frac{d}{dx} \det(A) = \det(A) \operatorname{tr}\left(A^{-1} \frac{d A}{d x}\right).$$

The partial derivative of the determinant with respect to an entry $A_{i,j}$ of $A$, can be deduced from Jacobi's formula, by using the fact that $\textstyle \frac{\partial A}{\partial A_{i,j} }$ is the matrix such that the entrry of the ith row and the jth column is 1, and all other entries are zero. One has

$$\frac{\partial }{\partial A_{i,j}} \det(A) = \operatorname{adj}(A)_{j,i} = \det(A)\left(A^{-1}\right)_{j,i},$$

the last equality making sense only in the case of an invertible matrix.

This allows also to approximate the change of the determinant under a small deformation of the matrix:

$$\det(A + \varepsilon X) - \det(A) = \operatorname{tr}(\operatorname{adj}(A) X) \varepsilon + O\left(\varepsilon^2\right)$$,

In the case of a deformation of the identity matrix $I$ this yields

$$\det(I + \varepsilon X) = 1 + \operatorname{tr}(X) \varepsilon + O\left(\varepsilon^2\right).$$

This identity is used in describing Lie algebras associated to certain matrix Lie groups. For example, the special linear group $\operatorname{SL}_n$ is defined by the equation $\det A = 1,$ and this shows that its Lie algebra is the special linear Lie algebra $\mathfrak{sl}_n$ consisting of those matrices having trace zero.

== Computation ==
Determinants are mainly used as a theoretical tool. They are rarely calculated explicitly in numerical linear algebra, where for applications such as checking invertibility and finding eigenvalues the determinant has largely been supplanted by other techniques. Computational geometry, however, does frequently use calculations related to determinants.

While the determinant can be computed directly using the Leibniz rule this approach is extremely inefficient for large matrices, since that formula requires calculating $n!$ (with $!$ referring to the factorial) products for an $n \times n$ matrix, which makes the asymptotic growth rate of the number of required operations of order $n!$, which is considered to be very quick. The Laplace expansion is similarly inefficient. Therefore, more involved techniques have been developed for calculating determinants.

=== Gaussian elimination ===
Gaussian elimination consists of left multiplying a matrix by elementary matrices for getting a matrix in a row echelon form. One can restrict the computation to elementary matrices of determinant 1. In this case, the determinant of the resulting row echelon form equals the determinant of the initial matrix. As a row echelon form is a triangular matrix, its determinant is the product of the entries of its diagonal.

So, the determinant can be computed for almost free from the result of a Gaussian elimination.

=== Decomposition methods ===
Some methods compute $\det(A)$ by writing the matrix as a product of matrices whose determinants can be more easily computed. Such techniques are referred to as decomposition methods. Examples include the LU decomposition, the QR decomposition or the Cholesky decomposition (for positive definite matrices). These methods are of order $\operatorname O(n^3)$, which is a significant improvement over $\operatorname O (n!)$.

For example, LU decomposition expresses $A$ as a product

$$A = PLU.$$

of a permutation matrix $P$ (which has exactly a single $1$ in each column, and otherwise zeros), a lower triangular matrix $L$ and an upper triangular matrix $U$. The determinants of the two triangular matrices $L$ and $U$ can be quickly calculated, since they are the products of the respective diagonal entries. The determinant of $P$ is just the sign $\varepsilon$ of the corresponding permutation (which is $+1$ for an even number of permutations and is $-1$ for an odd number of permutations). Once such a LU decomposition is known for $A$, its determinant is readily computed as

$$\det(A) = \varepsilon \det(L)\cdot\det(U).$$

=== Further methods ===
The order $\operatorname O(n^3)$ reached by decomposition methods has been improved by different methods. If two matrices of order $n$ can be multiplied in time $M(n)$, where $M(n) \ge n^a$ for some $a>2$, then there is an algorithm computing the determinant in time $O(M(n))$. This means, for example, that an $\operatorname O(n^{2.376})$ algorithm for computing the determinant exists based on the Coppersmith–Winograd algorithm. This exponent has been further lowered, as of 2016, to 2.373.

In addition to the complexity of the algorithm, further criteria can be used to compare algorithms. Especially for applications concerning matrices over rings, algorithms that compute the determinant without any divisions exist. (By contrast, Gauss elimination requires divisions.) One such algorithm, having complexity $\operatorname O(n^4)$ is based on the following idea: one replaces permutations (as in the Leibniz rule) by so-called closed ordered walks, in which several items can be repeated. The resulting sum has more terms than in the Leibniz rule, but in the process several of these products can be reused, making it more efficient than naively computing with the Leibniz rule. Algorithms can also be assessed according to their bit complexity, i.e., how many bits of accuracy are needed to store intermediate values occurring in the computation. For example, the Gaussian elimination (or LU decomposition) method is of order $\operatorname O(n^3)$, but the bit length of intermediate values can become exponentially long. By comparison, the Bareiss Algorithm, is an exact-division method (so it does use division, but only in cases where these divisions can be performed without remainder) is of the same order, but the bit complexity is roughly the bit size of the original entries in the matrix times $n$.

If the determinant of A and the inverse of A have already been computed, the matrix determinant lemma allows rapid calculation of the determinant of A + uv^{T}, where u and v are column vectors.

Charles Dodgson (i.e. Lewis Carroll of Alice's Adventures in Wonderland fame) invented a method for computing determinants called Dodgson condensation. This method does not always work in its original form.

== Uses in mathematics ==
=== In linear algebra ===
Determinants are a fundamental tool in linear algebra.

They are rarely used in numerical computations, since they are typically a by-product of the computations in which they could be involved, and no faster algorithms are known for a direct computation.

On the other hand they are unavoidable in proofs, and when matrix entries are functions or depend on parameters. Here are their main uses in linear algebra.

- Cramer's rule: Given a system of linear equations consisting in n linearly independent equations in n unknowns, Cramer's rule express each unknown as a quotient of two determinants formed with the coefficients of the system.
- Adjugate matrix: Given a square matrix, its adjugate matrix is a matrix whose entries are determinants of submatrices. If the matrix is invertible, it allows expressing each entry of the inerse of an invertible matrix as the quotient of two determinants, an entry of the adjugate matrix divided by the determinant of the inverted matrix.
- Rank of a matrix: The rank of a matrix is less to or equal to k if, for all square submatrices of dimension larger than k, the determinant zero. This is not a good method for computing the rank of a matrix, but this shows immediately that the space of the submatrices of rank at most k of a generic $m\times n$matrix is an algebraic set, in fact an algebraic variety. This observation plays a fundamental role in the theories of Grassmannians and determinantal ideals
- Hadamard's inequality gives upper bounds of the absolute values of problem solutions that can be expressed in terms of determinants (such as the two first above items). In particular, when starting from a matrix of integers, this allows bounding the size of every integer appearing in the solution. A common challenge, is to design algorithms such that every integer used during the resolution does not exceed this bound. This is the case for Bareiss algorithm and multi-modular arithmetic followed with Chinese remaindering.

=== In Euclidean geometry ===
This section is devoted to properties of points in a Euclidean space that are expressed in terms of determinants involving their Cartesian coordinates. By abuse of notation, an expression such as $P=(x,y)$ means that $P$ is a point in a Euclidean plane that has $x$ and $y$ as Cartesian coordinates.

==== Plane geometry ====
Let $P_0=(x_0,y_0)$, $P_1=(x_1,y_1)$, and $P_2=(x_2,y_2)$ be three points in a Euclidean plane.

The three points are collinear (that is, belong to the same line), if and only if (Note: Some authors place the row of ones at the bottom or use the transpose of the matrix. This does not change the determinant. The choice done in this article makes slightly simpler the presentation of the content of this section,)

$$\det \begin{pmatrix}
1&1&1\\
x_0 & x_1 & x_2\\
y_0 & y_1 & y_2
\end{pmatrix} =0.$$

If one subtracts the first column from the two others, and then computes the Laplace expansion along the first row, one gets the equality
$$\det \begin{pmatrix}
1&1&1\\
x_0 & x_1 & x_2\\
y_0 & y_1 & y_2
\end{pmatrix} =
\det \begin{pmatrix}
x_1-x_0 & x_2-x_0\\
y_1-y_0 & y_2-y_0 \end{pmatrix}
.$$
This means that the determinant considered here is the determinant of the vectors $\vec{P_0P_1}$ and $\vec{P_0P_2}$.

If the points are not aligned, the absolute value of the determinant is twice the area of the triangle defined by the points, and the sign of the determinant determines the orientation of the triangle: it is positive if and only if $P_0$ is on the left when running from $P_1$ to $P_2$.

If one replaces $P_0$ with an indeterminate point $P = (X,Y)$, one gets the implicit equation of the line passing through two (distinct) points $P_1$ and $P_2$:
$$\det \begin{pmatrix}
1&1&1\\
X & x_1 & x_2\\
Y & y_1 & y_2
\end{pmatrix} =0.$$
Expanding along the first column and reordering terms gives a more usual form of the implicit equation:
$$X(y_2-y_1) + Y (x_2-x_1) +(x_1y_2-x_2y_1)=0.$$

==== Dimension 3 and higher ====
Let $P_0=(x_0,y_0, z_0)$, $P_1=(x_1,y_1, z_1)$, $P_2=(x_2,y_2,z_2)$, and $P_3=(x_3,y_3,z_3)$ be four points in a tridimensional Euclidean space.

The four points are coplanar (that is, belong to the same plane), if and only if
$$\det \begin{pmatrix}
1&1&1&1\\
x_0 & x_1 & x_2 & x_3\\
y_0 & y_1 & y_2 & y_3 \\
z_0 & z_1 & z_2 & z_3
\end{pmatrix} =0.$$

If one subtracts the first column from the three others, and then computes the Laplace expansion along the first row, one gets the equality
$$\det \begin{pmatrix}
1&1&1&1\\
x_0 & x_1 & x_2 & x_3\\
y_0 & y_1 & y_2 & y_3 \\
z_0 & z_1 & z_2 & z_3
\end{pmatrix} =
\det \begin{pmatrix}
x_1-x_0 & x_2-x_0 & x_3 -x_0\\
y_1-y_0 & y_2-y_0 & y_3 -y_0\\
z_1-z_0 & z_2-z_0 & z_3 -z_0
\end{pmatrix}
.$$
This means that the determinant considered here is the determinant of the vectors $\vec{P_0P_1}$, $\vec{P_0P_2}$, and $\vec{P_0P_3}$.

If the points are not coplanar, the absolute value of the determinant is six times the volume of the tetrahedron defined by the points, and the sign of the determinant determines the orientation of the tetrahedon; in particular, this sign determines the side of the plane $P_1P_2P_3$ where $P_0$ is placed. This criterion is commonly used in computer graphics and computer vision to recognize the hidden parts of a 3D figure.

If one replaces $P_0$ with an indeterminate point $P = (X,Y,Z)$, one gets the implicit equation of the plane passing through three non-collinear points $P_1$, $P_2$, and $P_3$:
$$\det \begin{pmatrix}
1&1&1&1\\
X & x_1 & x_2 & x_3\\
Y & y_1 & y_2 & y_3 \\
Z & z_1 & z_2 & z_3
\end{pmatrix} =0.$$
Expanding along the first column reordering the terms, and changing the sign gives a conventional form of the implicit equation:
$$X \,\begin{vmatrix}
1&1&1\\
y_1 & y_2 & y_3\\
z_1 & z_2 & z_3
\end{vmatrix} -Y \, \begin{vmatrix}
1&1&1\\
x_1 & x_2 & x_3\\
z_1 & z_2 & z_3
\end{vmatrix} + Z\, \begin{vmatrix}
1&1&1\\
x_1 & x_2 & x_3\\
y_1 & y_2 & y_3
\end{vmatrix} - \begin{vmatrix}
x_1 & x_2 & x_3\\
y_1 & y_2 & y_3 \\
z_1 & z_2 & z_3
\end{vmatrix} =0.$$

In a higher dimension n, things work similarly, with n coordinates, $n+1$ points, and "coplanar" and "tetrahedron" replaced with "belonging to the same hyperplane" and "simplex". Besides the change of matrix dimensions, the main change is that the determinant is $n!$ (factorial n) times the volume of the simplex.

=== Eigenvalues and characteristic polynomial ===
An eigenvalue of a linear endomorphism $f$ is a scalar $\lambda$ such that there is a nonzero vector $u$ (called eigenvector) such that $f(u)=\lambda u$. Expressed in term of matrices, this means that an eigenvalue of a matrix $A$ is a scalar $\lambda$ such that there exists a nonzero column vector $U$ such that
$$AU=\lambda U.$$
It is equivalent to say that
$$(\lambda I-A)  U=0,$$
where $I$ and $0$ denote respectively the identity matrix and the zero column vector of the convenient size. This means exactly that the columns of $\lambda I-A$ are linearly dependent, or equivalently that
$$\det (\lambda I-A) =0.$$

In other words, the eigenvalues are the roots of the polynomial $\det (X I-A)$, which is called the characteristic polynomial of the matrix $A$. Being a determinant, the characteristic polynomial is invariant under matrix similarity, and is therefore defined also for linear endomorphisms.

For a square matrix $A$ of order $n$, the characteristic polynomial is a monic polynomial of degree $n$. All its coefficients are invariant under matrix similarity. Its constant coefficient, obtained by setting $X=0$, is $(-1)^n\det(A)$.

The coefficient of $X^{n-1}$ in the characteristic polynomial is $-\operatorname{Tr} (A)$, where $\operatorname{Tr} (A)$, denotes the trace of the matrix. Per Viete's formula, it is the sum of the eigenvalues (counted with their multiplicities). It results from the Leibniz formula that the trace is also the sum of the diagonal entries of $A$ and of every matrix similar to $A$.

=== Determinants of functions ===
Several sorts of determinant of matrices having functions as entries are commonly considered. They are named typically after the mathematician who introduced them.

==== Jacobian determinant ====
The Jacobian matrix of a tuple of differentiable functions is the matrix of their partial derivatives. That is, given n differentiable functions $f_1(x_1, \ldots, x_m), \ldots, f_n(x_1,\ldots, x_m)$ in m variables $x_1, \ldots, x_m$, the Jacobian matrix is the matrix
$$\begin{pmatrix}\tfrac{\partial f_1}{\partial x_1} & \ldots & \tfrac{\partial f_n}{\partial x_1}\\
\vdots & \cdots & \vdots\\
\tfrac{\partial f_1}{\partial x_m} & \ldots & \tfrac{\partial f_n}{\partial x_m}
\end{pmatrix}.$$
When $m=n$, the determinant of a Jacobian matrix is called the Jacobian determinant. It is thus a function of the n variables.

The Jacobian matrix is a generalization of the usual derivative to multivariate vector valued functions. In this generalization, the common condition $f'(x)\ne 0$ is replaced $J\ne 0$, where J is the Jacobian determinant.

Among the numerous uses of the Jacobian determinant, the two following ones are especially important:

- The Jacobian determinant occurs in the formula for a change of variable in a multiple integral.
- The nonnullity of the Jacobian determinant is a hypothesis of the Implicit function theorem and the inverse function theorem .

==== Wronskian ====
Determinants can be used to characterize Given functions $f_1(x), \dots, f_n(x)$ (supposed to be $n-1$ times differentiable), the Wronskian is defined to be

$$W(f_1, \ldots, f_n)(x) =
\begin{vmatrix}
f_1(x) &         f_2(x) & \cdots &         f_n(x) \\
f_1'(x) &        f_2'(x) & \cdots &        f_n'(x) \\
\vdots &         \vdots & \ddots &         \vdots \\
f_1^{(n-1)}(x) & f_2^{(n-1)}(x) & \cdots & f_n^{(n-1)}(x)
\end{vmatrix}.$$

If it can be shown that the Wronskian is zero everywhere on an interval then, in the case of analytic functions, this implies that the given functions are linearly dependent. See the Wronskian and linear independence.

=== In vector geometry ===
This section is about the use of determinants in a Euclidean vector space, that is, a real vector space, typically $\R^n$, endowed with the usual quadratic norm.

==== Orientation ====
The Determinant of n vectors in is nonzero if and only the vectors form a basis of.

In that case, the sign of the determinant determines whether the orientation of the basis is the same or opposite to the orientation of the standard basis. In the case of an orthogonal basis, the absolute value of the determinant equals the product of the lengths of the basis vectors. In particular, for an orthonormal basis, all basis vectors have a length equal to 1, and the determinant is either 1, if the basis has the same orirntation as the standard basis, or –1, otherwise.

More generally, n linearly independent vectors define a linear transformation that maps the standard basis to these vectors. So, a linear transformation preserves the space orientation if its determinant is positive and reverses the orientation if its determinant is negative. As the determinant of a linear transformation is independent of the choice of a particular basis, preserving or reversing the orientation is a property of a linear transformation that does not depend on any basis.

==== Signed volume of a parallelotope ====
The volume of this parallelepiped is the absolute value of the determinant of the three vectors r1, r2, and r3.

Let $v_1, \ldots, v_n$ be n vectors in an Euclidean vector space of dimension n. The parallelotope generated by these vectors is the set of all vectors $a_1v_1+\cdots, a_nv_n$ such that every $a_i$ is a real number such that $0\le a_i \le 1$.

Given an orthonormal basis (often the standard basis of $\R^n$), the n-dimensional volume of the parallelotope generated by n vectors is the absolute value of the determinant of these vectors on this basis. The volume is zero if the vectors are linearly dependent. If the vectors are linearly independent, the determinant is positive if the vectors have the same orientation as the basis vectors, and otherwise negative.

The parallelotope generated by an orthonormal basis is a unit hypercube and its volume is 1.

Since a linear transformation is uniquely defined by the image of an orthonormal basis, the determinant $D$ of a bijective linear transformation $f$ of a $n$-dimensional Euclidean vector space has the following properties:

- If $D>0$, the transformation $f$ preserves space orientation.
- If $D<0$, the transformation $f$ reverses space orientation.
- The transformation $f$ multiplies every n-dimensional volume by the absolute value $\vert D\vert$.

==== Volume and Jacobian determinant ====
As pointed out above, the absolute value of the determinant of real vectors is equal to the volume of the parallelepiped spanned by those vectors. As a consequence, if $f : \mathbf R^n \to \mathbf R^n$ is the linear map given by multiplication with a matrix $A$, and $S \subset \mathbf R^n$ is any measurable subset, then the volume of $f(S)$ is given by $|\det(A)|$ times the volume of $S$. More generally, if the linear map $f : \mathbf R^n \to \mathbf R^m$ is represented by the $m \times n$ matrix $A$, then the ratio between the $n$-dimensional volumes of $f(S)$ and $S$ is given by:

$$\frac{\operatorname{volume}(f(S))}{\operatorname{volume}(S)} = \sqrt{\det\left(A^\textsf{T} A\right)}.$$

When $m < n$ this is zero.

By calculating the volume of the tetrahedron bounded by four points, they can be used to identify skew lines. The volume of any tetrahedron, given its vertices $a, b, c, d$, $\frac 1 6 \cdot |\det(a-b,b-c,c-d)|$, or any other combination of pairs of vertices that form a spanning tree over the vertices.

A nonlinear map $f \colon \mathbf{R}^{2} \to \mathbf{R}^{2}$ sends a small square (left, in red) to a distorted parallelogram (right, in red). The Jacobian at a point gives the best linear approximation of the distorted parallelogram near that point (right, in translucent white), and the Jacobian determinant gives the ratio of the area of the approximating parallelogram to that of the original square.

For a general differentiable function, much of the above carries over by considering the Jacobian matrix of f. For

$$f: \mathbf R^n \rightarrow \mathbf R^n,$$

the Jacobian matrix is the n × n matrix whose entries are given by the partial derivatives

$$D(f) = \left(\frac {\partial f_i}{\partial x_j}\right)_{1 \leq i, j \leq n}.$$

Its determinant, the Jacobian determinant, appears in the higher-dimensional version of integration by substitution: for suitable functions f and an open subset U of R^{n} (the domain of f), the integral over f(U) of some other function φ : R^{n} → R^{m} is given by

$$\int_{f(U)} \phi(\mathbf{v})\, d\mathbf{v} = \int_U \phi(f(\mathbf{u})) \left|\det(\operatorname{D}f)(\mathbf{u})\right| \,d\mathbf{u}.$$

The Jacobian also occurs in the inverse function theorem.

When applied to the field of Cartography, the determinant can be used to measure the rate of expansion of a map near the poles.

== Generalizations ==
Generalizations that are not treated here include:

The immanant which is defined by replacing in Leibniz formula the factors $\sgn(\sigma)$ with another character of the symmetric group $S_n$. A special case is the permanent, which replaces $\sgn(\sigma)$ by the constant 1.

=== Exterior algebra ===
The determinant of a linear transformation $T : V \to V$ of an $n$-dimensional vector space $V$ or, more generally a free module of (finite) rank $n$ over a commutative ring $R$ can be formulated in a coordinate-free manner by considering the $n$-th exterior power $\bigwedge^n V$ of $V$. The map $T$ induces a linear map

$$\begin{align}
\bigwedge^n T: \bigwedge^n V &\rightarrow \bigwedge^n V \\
v_1 \wedge v_2 \wedge \dots \wedge v_n &\mapsto T v_1 \wedge T v_2 \wedge \dots \wedge T v_n.
\end{align}$$

As $\bigwedge^n V$ is one-dimensional, the map $\bigwedge^n T$ is given by multiplying with some scalar, i.e., an element in $R$. Some authors such as (Bourbaki 1998) use this fact to define the determinant to be the element in $R$ satisfying the following identity (for all $v_i \in V$):

$$\left(\bigwedge^n T\right)\left(v_1 \wedge \dots \wedge v_n\right) = \det(T) \cdot v_1 \wedge \dots \wedge v_n.$$

This definition agrees with the more concrete coordinate-dependent definition. This can be shown using the uniqueness of a multilinear alternating form on $n$-tuples of vectors in $R^n$. For this reason, the highest non-zero exterior power $\bigwedge^n V$ (as opposed to the determinant associated to an endomorphism) is sometimes also called the determinant of $V$ and similarly for more involved objects such as vector bundles or chain complexes of vector spaces. Minors of a matrix can also be cast in this setting, by considering lower alternating forms $\bigwedge^k V$ with $k < n$.

=== Determinants for finite-dimensional algebras ===
For any associative algebra $A$ that is finite-dimensional as a vector space over a field $F$, there is a determinant map

$$\det : A \to F.$$

This definition proceeds by establishing the characteristic polynomial independently of the determinant, and defining the determinant as the lowest order term of this polynomial. This general definition recovers the determinant for the matrix algebra $A = \operatorname{Mat}_{n \times n}(F)$, but also includes several further cases including the determinant of a quaternion,

$$\det (a + ib+jc+kd) = a^2 + b^2 + c^2 + d^2$$,

the norm $N_{L/F} : L \to F$ of a field extension, as well as the Pfaffian of a skew-symmetric matrix and the reduced norm of a central simple algebra.

=== Infinite matrices ===
For matrices with an infinite number of rows and columns, the above definitions of the determinant do not carry over directly. For example, in the Leibniz formula, an infinite sum (all of whose terms are infinite products) would have to be calculated. Functional analysis provides different extensions of the determinant for such infinite-dimensional situations, which however only work for particular kinds of operators.

The Fredholm determinant defines the determinant for operators known as trace class operators by an appropriate generalization of the formula

$$\det(I+A) = \exp(\operatorname{tr}(\log(I+A))).$$

Another infinite-dimensional notion of determinant is the functional determinant.

=== Operators in von Neumann algebras ===
For operators in a finite factor, one may define a positive real-valued determinant called the Fuglede−Kadison determinant using the canonical trace. In fact, corresponding to every tracial state on a von Neumann algebra there is a notion of Fuglede−Kadison determinant.

=== Related notions for non-commutative rings ===
For square matrices with entries in a non-commutative ring, there are various difficulties in defining determinants analogously to that for commutative rings. Multilinearity (Note: In the non-commutative setting left-linearity (compatibility with left-multiplication by scalars) must be distinguished from right-linearity. An matrix can be linear on both sides only over a commutative ring: for any two scalars a and b, $$\begin{align} ab &= ab \begin{vmatrix}1&0 \\ 0&1\end{vmatrix} =  a \begin{vmatrix}1&0 \\ 0&b\end{vmatrix} \\[5mu] &=    \begin{vmatrix}a&0 \\ 0&b\end{vmatrix} =  b \begin{vmatrix}a&0 \\ 0&1\end{vmatrix} = ba \begin{vmatrix}1&0 \\ 0&1\end{vmatrix} = ba, \end{align}$$ and thus a and b commute.) and alternation are incompatible for n ≥ 2, so there is no definition preferred by "abstract nonsense".

A meaning can be given to the Leibniz formula provided that the order for the product is specified, and similarly for other definitions of the determinant, but non-commutativity then leads to the loss of many fundamental properties of the determinant, such as the multiplicative property or that the determinant is unchanged under transposition of the matrix.

Various notions of non-commutative determinant have been formulated that preserve some of the properties of determinants, notably quasideterminants and the Dieudonné determinant. For some classes of matrices with non-commutative elements, one can prove linear algebra theorems that are very similar to their commutative analogs. Examples include the q-determinant on quantum groups, the Capelli determinant on Capelli matrices, and the Berezinian on supermatrices (i.e., matrices whose entries are elements of $\mathbb Z_2$-graded rings). Manin matrices form the class closest to matrices with commutative elements.

== History ==
Historically, determinants were used long before matrices: A determinant was originally defined as a property of a system of linear equations. The determinant "determines" whether the system has a unique solution (which occurs precisely if the determinant is non-zero). In Europe, solutions of linear systems of two equations were expressed by Cardano in 1545 by a determinant-like entity.

Determinants proper originated separately from the work of Seki Takakazu in 1683 in Japan and parallelly of Leibniz in 1693. Cramer (1750) stated, without proof, Cramer's rule. Both Cramer and also Bézout (1779) were led to determinants by the question of plane curves passing through a given set of points.

Vandermonde (1771) first recognized determinants as independent functions. Laplace (1772) gave the general method of expanding a determinant in terms of its complementary minors: Vandermonde had already given a special case. Immediately following, Lagrange (1773) treated determinants of the second and third order and applied it to questions of elimination theory; he proved many special cases of general identities.

Gauss (1801) made the next advance. Like Lagrange, he made much use of determinants in the theory of numbers. He introduced the word "determinant" (Laplace had used "resultant"), though not in the present signification, but rather as applied to the discriminant of a quadratic form. Gauss also arrived at the notion of reciprocal (inverse) determinants, and came very near the multiplication theorem.

The next contributor of importance is Binet (1811, 1812), who formally stated the theorem relating to the product of two matrices of m columns and n rows, which for the special case of m = n reduces to the multiplication theorem. On the same day (November 30, 1812) that Binet presented his paper to the Academy, Cauchy also presented one on the subject. (See Cauchy–Binet formula.) In this he used the word "determinant" in its present sense, summarized and simplified what was then known on the subject, improved the notation, and gave the multiplication theorem with a proof more satisfactory than Binet's. With him begins the theory in its generality.

Jacobi (1841) used the functional determinant which Sylvester later called the Jacobian. In his memoirs in Crelle's Journal for 1841 he specially treats this subject, as well as the class of alternating functions which Sylvester has called alternants. About the time of Jacobi's last memoirs, Sylvester (1839) and Cayley began their work. Cayley 1841 introduced the modern notation for the determinant using vertical bars.

The study of special forms of determinants has been the natural result of the completion of the general theory. Axisymmetric determinants have been studied by Lebesgue, Hesse, and Sylvester; persymmetric determinants by Sylvester and Hankel; circulants by Catalan, Spottiswoode, Glaisher, and Scott; skew determinants and Pfaffians, in connection with the theory of orthogonal transformation, by Cayley; continuants by Sylvester; Wronskians (so called by Muir) by Christoffel and Frobenius; compound determinants by Sylvester, Reiss, and Picquet; Jacobians and Hessians by Sylvester; and symmetric gauche determinants by Trudi. Of the textbooks on the subject Spottiswoode's was the first. In America, Hanus (1886), Weld (1893), and Muir/Metzler (1933) published treatises.

== Block matrices and matrix sums ==
The formula for the determinant of a $2 \times 2$ matrix above continues to hold, under appropriate further assumptions, for a block matrix, i.e., a matrix composed of four submatrices $A, B, C, D$ of dimension $m \times m$, $m \times n$, $n \times m$ and $n \times n$, respectively. The easiest such formula, which can be proven using either the Leibniz formula or a factorization involving the Schur complement, is

$$\det\begin{pmatrix}A& 0\\ C& D\end{pmatrix} = \det(A) \det(D) = \det\begin{pmatrix}A& B\\ 0& D\end{pmatrix}.$$

If $A$ is invertible, then it follows with results from the section on multiplicativity that

$$\begin{align}
\det\begin{pmatrix}A& B\\ C& D\end{pmatrix}
& = \det(A)\det\begin{pmatrix}A& B\\ C& D\end{pmatrix}
\underbrace{\det\begin{pmatrix}A^{-1}& -A^{-1} B\\ 0& I_n\end{pmatrix}}_{=\,\det(A^{-1})\,=\,(\det A)^{-1}}\\
& = \det(A) \det\begin{pmatrix}I_m& 0\\ C A^{-1}& D-C A^{-1} B\end{pmatrix}\\
& = \det(A) \det(D - C A^{-1} B),
\end{align}$$

which simplifies to $\det (A) (D - C A^{-1} B)$ when $D$ is a $1 \times 1$ matrix.

A similar result holds when $D$ is invertible, namely

$$\begin{align}
\det\begin{pmatrix}A& B\\ C& D\end{pmatrix}
& = \det(D)\det\begin{pmatrix}A& B\\ C& D\end{pmatrix}
\underbrace{\det\begin{pmatrix}I_m& 0\\ -D^{-1} C&  D^{-1}\end{pmatrix}}_{=\,\det(D^{-1})\,=\,(\det D)^{-1}}\\
& = \det(D) \det\begin{pmatrix}A - B D^{-1} C& B D^{-1}\\ 0& I_n\end{pmatrix}\\
& = \det(D) \det(A - B D^{-1} C).
\end{align}$$

Both results can be combined to derive Sylvester's determinant theorem, which is also stated below.

If the blocks are square matrices of the same size further formulas hold. For example, if $C$ and $D$ commute (i.e., $CD=DC$), then

$$\det\begin{pmatrix}A& B\\ C& D\end{pmatrix} = \det(AD - BC).$$

This formula has been generalized to matrices composed of more than $2 \times 2$ blocks, again under appropriate commutativity conditions among the individual blocks.

For $A = D$ and $B = C$, the following formula holds (even if $A$ and $B$ do not commute).

$$\det\begin{pmatrix}A & B\\ B & A\end{pmatrix} = \det\begin{pmatrix}A+B & B\\ B+A & A\end{pmatrix} = \det\begin{pmatrix}A+B & B\\ 0 & A-B\end{pmatrix} = \det(A+B) \det(A-B).$$

It is possible to compute the determinant by the block matrices in a fast way with the use of fast matrix multiplication algorithms in the time $O({n^\omega })$ for $~2.37 \le \omega < 3$, by the $LU$ decomposition.

=== Sum ===
The determinant of the sum $A+B$ of two square matrices of the same size is not in general expressible in terms of the determinants of A and of B.

However, for positive semidefinite matrices $A$, $B$ and $C$ of equal size,
$$\det(A + B + C) + \det(C) \geq \det(A + C) + \det(B + C)\text{,}$$
with the corollary
$$\det(A + B) \geq \det(A) + \det(B)\text{.}$$

Brunn–Minkowski theorem implies that the nth root of determinant is a concave function, when restricted to Hermitian positive-definite $n\times n$ matrices. Therefore, if A and B are Hermitian positive-definite $n\times n$ matrices, one has
$$\sqrt[n]{\det(A+B)}\geq\sqrt[n]{\det(A)}+\sqrt[n]{\det(B)},$$
since the nth root of the determinant is a homogeneous function.

== See also ==
- Berezin integral
- Cauchy determinant
- Cayley–Menger determinant
- Dieudonné determinant
- Slater determinant
- Sylvester's determinant theorem
- Determinantal conjecture
