= Clarica =

Clarica can refer to:

- Clarica or Claricia, a 13th-century nun and illuminator
- Clarica Life Assurance, a Canadian insurer based in Waterloo, Ontario
