= Trudi =

Trudi is a given name. Notable people with the name include:

- Trudi Ames (born 1946), American actress
- Trudi Birger (1927–2002) German Holocaust survivor and writer
- Trudi Canavan (born 1969), Australian writer
- Trudi Le Caine (1911–1999), German arts patron
- Trudi Carter (born 1994), Jamaican footballer
- Trudi Guda (born 1940), Surinamese poet
- Trudi Lacey (born 1958), American basketball coach
- Trudi Lenon, Australian murderer
- Trudi Maree (born 1988), South African swimmer
- Trudi Makhaya, South African economist
- Trudi Meyer (1914–1999), German Olympic athlete
- Trudi Musgrave (born 1977), Australian tennis player
- Trudi Roth (1930–2016), Swiss film actress
- Trudi Schmidt (born 1938), Democratic Party member of the Montana Legislature, representing District 11 since 2011
- Trudi Schoop (1904–1999), Swiss dancer
- Trudi Trueit (born 1963), American author
- Trudi Walend (born 1943), Republican member of the North Carolina General Assembly
- Trudi Wilkes (born 1973), British voice artist
- Trudi Williams (born 1953), Florida Republican politician

== See also ==
- Trudy (disambiguation)
