= Guda =

Guda may refer to:

== People ==
- Daniel Guda (born 1996), Australian badminton player
- Guda (nun), 12th-century nun and illuminator
- Guda Anjaiah (1955–2016), Indian author
- Idi Othman Guda (1941–2015), Nigerian politician
- Trudi Guda (born 1940), Surinamese poet and anthropologist

== Places ==
- Gudå, Norway

== Other ==
- Guda or tulum (bagpipe)
