= Gudas =

Gudas may refer to:

== Locations ==
- Gudas, Ariège, a commune in France
- Gudas, Belgaum, a settlement in Belgaum district, India

== Surname ==
- Leo Gudas, a Czech hockey player
- Mindaugas Gudas, Lithuanian politician and statesman
- Radko Gudas, a Czech hockey player

== See also ==
- Guda (disambiguation)
