= Laplace expansion =

Expression of a determinant in terms of minors

In linear algebra, the Laplace expansion, named after Pierre-Simon Laplace, also called cofactor expansion, is an expression of the determinant of an n × n-matrix B as a weighted sum of minors, which are the determinants of some (n − 1) × (n − 1)-submatrices of B. Specifically, for every i, the Laplace expansion along the ith row is the equality
$$\begin{align}
\det(B)&= \sum_{j=1}^{n} (-1)^{i+j}  b_{i,j} m_{i, j},
\end{align}$$
where $b_{i,j}$ is the entry of the ith row and jth column of B, and $m_{i,j}$ is the determinant of the submatrix obtained by removing the ith row and the jth column of B. Similarly, the Laplace expansion along the jth column is the equality
$$\begin{align}
\det(B)&= \sum_{i=1}^{n} (-1)^{i+j}  b_{i,j} m_{i, j}.
\end{align}$$
(Each identity implies the other, since the determinants of both a matrix and its transpose are the same.)

The coefficient $(-1)^{i+j} m_{i, j}$ of $b_{i,j}$ in the above sum is called the cofactor of $b_{i,j}$ in B.

The Laplace expansion is often useful in proofs, as in, for example, allowing recursion on the size of matrices. It is also of didactic interest for its simplicity and as one of several ways to view and compute the determinant. For large matrices, it quickly becomes inefficient to compute when compared to Gaussian elimination.

== Examples ==
Consider the matrix

$$B = \begin{bmatrix} 1 & 2 & 3 \\ 4 & 5 & 6 \\ 7 & 8 & 9 \end{bmatrix}.$$

The determinant of this matrix can be computed by using the Laplace expansion along any one of its rows or columns. For instance, an expansion along the first row yields:

$$\begin{align}
|B| & = 1 \cdot \begin{vmatrix} 5 & 6 \\ 8 & 9 \end{vmatrix} - 2 \cdot \begin{vmatrix} 4 & 6 \\ 7 & 9 \end{vmatrix} + 3 \cdot \begin{vmatrix} 4 & 5 \\ 7 & 8 \end{vmatrix} \\[5pt]
& = 1 \cdot (-3) - 2 \cdot (-6) + 3 \cdot (-3) = 0.
\end{align}$$

Laplace expansion along the second column yields the same result:

$$\begin{align}
|B| & = -2 \cdot \begin{vmatrix} 4 & 6 \\ 7 & 9 \end{vmatrix} + 5 \cdot \begin{vmatrix} 1 & 3 \\ 7 & 9 \end{vmatrix} - 8 \cdot \begin{vmatrix} 1 & 3 \\ 4 & 6 \end{vmatrix} \\[5pt]
& = -2 \cdot (-6) + 5 \cdot (-12) - 8 \cdot (-6) = 0.
\end{align}$$

It is easy to verify that the result is correct: the matrix is singular because the sum of its first and third column is twice the second column, and hence its determinant is zero.

== Proof ==
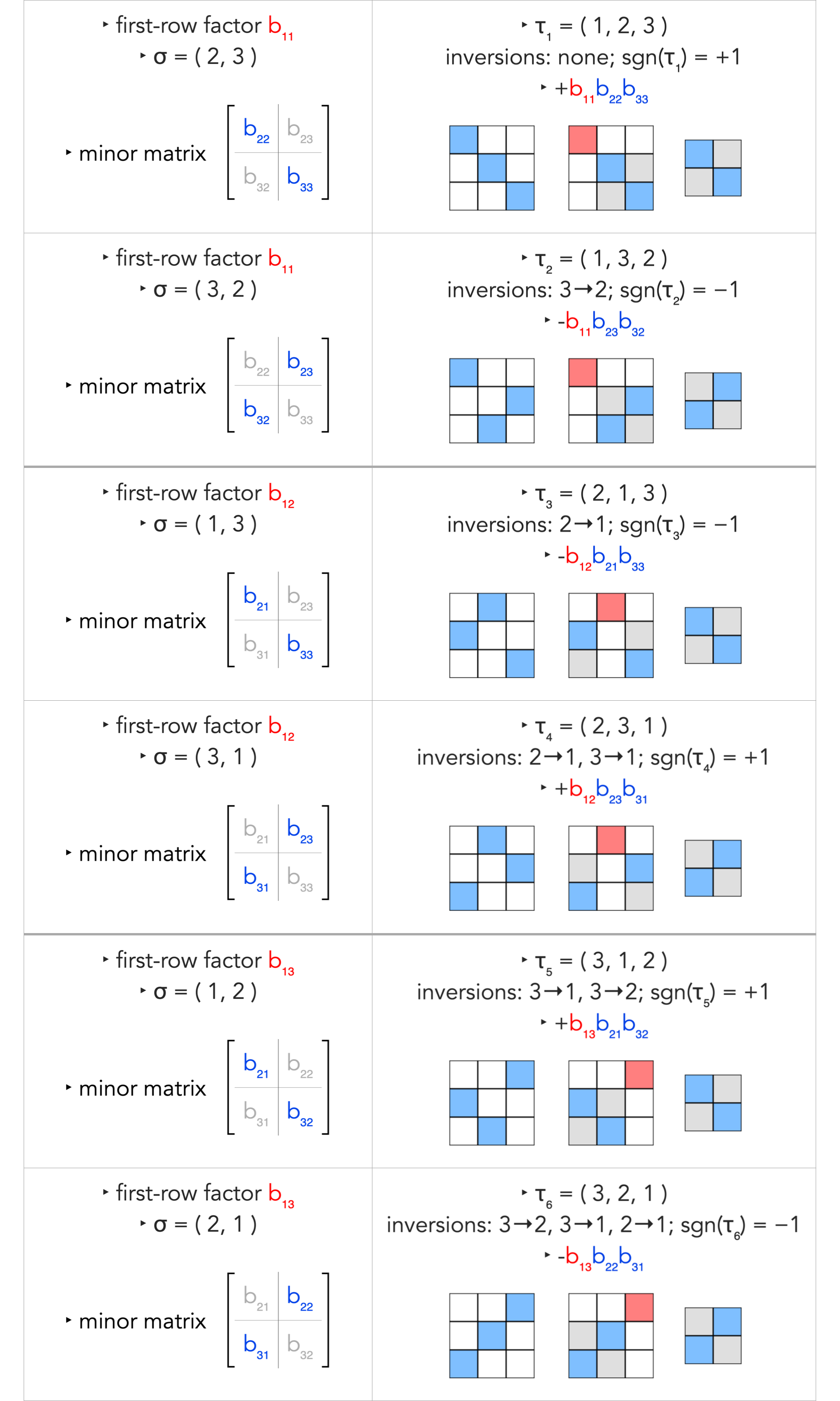
Visualization of Laplace expansion in the 3×3 case: each determinant permutation term is built from a first-row choice and a permutation term from the corresponding 2×2 minor

Suppose $B$ is an n × n matrix and $i,j\in\{1,2,\dots,n\}.$ For clarity we also label the entries of $B$ that compose its $i,j$ minor matrix $M_{ij}$ as

$(a_{st})$ for $1 \le s,t \le n-1.$

Consider the terms in the expansion of $|B|$ that have $b_{ij}$ as a factor. Each has the form

$$\sgn \tau\,b_{1,\tau(1)} \cdots b_{i,j} \cdots b_{n,\tau(n)}
= \sgn \tau\,b_{ij} a_{1,\sigma(1)} \cdots a_{n-1,\sigma(n-1)}$$

for some permutation τ ∈ S_{n} with $\tau(i)=j$, and a unique and evidently related permutation $\sigma\in S_{n-1}$ which selects the same minor entries as τ. Similarly each choice of σ determines a corresponding τ i.e. the correspondence $\sigma\leftrightarrow\tau$ is a bijection between $S_{n-1}$ and $\{\tau\in S_n\colon\tau(i)=j\}.$ Using Cauchy's two-line notation, the explicit relation between $\tau$ and $\sigma$ can be written as

$$\sigma = \begin{pmatrix} 1 & 2 & \cdots & i & \cdots &  n-1 \\ (\leftarrow)_j ( \tau(1) ) & (\leftarrow)_j ( \tau(2) ) & \cdots & (\leftarrow)_j ( \tau(i+1) ) & \cdots & (\leftarrow)_j ( \tau(n) ) \end{pmatrix}$$

where $(\leftarrow)_j$ is a temporary shorthand notation for a cycle $(n,n-1,\cdots,j+1,j)$. This operation decrements all indices larger than j so that every index fits in the set {1,2,...,n-1}

The permutation τ can be derived from σ as follows. Define $\sigma'\in S_n$ by $\sigma'(k) = \sigma(k)$ for $1 \le k \le n-1$ and $\sigma'(n) = n$. Then $\sigma'$ is expressed as

$$\sigma' = \begin{pmatrix} 1 & 2 & \cdots & i & \cdots &  n-1 & n \\ (\leftarrow)_j ( \tau(1) ) & (\leftarrow)_j ( \tau(2) ) & \cdots & (\leftarrow)_j ( \tau(i+1) ) & \cdots & (\leftarrow)_j ( \tau(n) ) & n\end{pmatrix}$$

Now, the operation which apply $(\leftarrow)_i$ first and then apply $\sigma'$ is (Notice applying A before B is equivalent to applying inverse of A to the upper row of B in two-line notation)

$$\sigma' (\leftarrow)_i = \begin{pmatrix} 1 & 2 &  \cdots & i+1 & \cdots &  n & i \\ (\leftarrow)_j ( \tau(1) ) & (\leftarrow)_j ( \tau(2) ) & \cdots & (\leftarrow)_j ( \tau(i+1) ) & \cdots & (\leftarrow)_j ( \tau(n) ) & n \end{pmatrix}$$

where $(\leftarrow)_i$ is temporary shorthand notation for $(n,n-1,\cdots,i+1,i)$.

the operation which applies $\tau$ first and then applies $(\leftarrow)_j$ is

$$(\leftarrow)_j \tau = \begin{pmatrix} 1 & 2 & \cdots & i & \cdots &  n-1 & n \\ (\leftarrow)_j ( \tau(1) ) & (\leftarrow)_j ( \tau(2) ) & \cdots & n & \cdots & (\leftarrow)_j ( \tau(n-1) ) &
(\leftarrow)_j ( \tau(n) ) \end{pmatrix}$$

above two are equal thus,

$$(\leftarrow)_j \tau  = \sigma' (\leftarrow)_i$$
$$\tau =  (\rightarrow)_j \sigma' (\leftarrow)_i$$

where $(\rightarrow)_j$ is the inverse of $(\leftarrow)_j$ which is $(j,j+1,\cdots,n)$.

Thus

$$\tau\,=(j,j+1,\ldots,n)\sigma'(n,n-1,\ldots,i)$$

Since the two cycles can be written respectively as $n-i$ and $n-j$ transpositions,

$$\sgn\tau\,= (-1)^{2n-(i+j)} \sgn\sigma'\,= (-1)^{i+j} \sgn\sigma.$$

And since the map $\sigma\leftrightarrow\tau$ is bijective,

$$\begin{align}
\sum_{i=1}^n\sum_{\tau \in S_n:\tau(i)=j} \sgn \tau\,b_{1,\tau(1)} \cdots b_{n,\tau(n)}
&= \sum_{i=1}^{n}\sum_{\sigma \in S_{n-1}} (-1)^{i+j}\sgn\sigma\, b_{ij}
a_{1,\sigma(1)} \cdots a_{n-1,\sigma(n-1)}\\
&= \sum_{i=1}^{n}b_{ij}(-1)^{i+j} \sum_{\sigma \in S_{n-1}} \sgn\sigma\,
a_{1,\sigma(1)} \cdots a_{n-1,\sigma(n-1)}\\
&= \sum_{i=1}^{n} b_{ij} (-1)^{i+j} M_{ij}
\end{align}$$

from which the result follows. Similarly, the result holds if the index of the outer summation was replaced with $j$.

== Laplace expansion of a determinant by complementary minors ==
Laplace's cofactor expansion can be generalised as follows.

=== Example ===
Consider the matrix

$$A = \begin{bmatrix} 1 & 2 & 3 & 4 \\ 5 & 6 & 7 & 8 \\ 9 & 10 & 11 & 12 \\ 13 & 14 & 15 & 16 \end{bmatrix}.$$

The determinant of this matrix can be computed by using the Laplace's cofactor expansion along the first two rows as follows. Firstly note that there are 6 sets of two distinct numbers in {1, 2, 3, 4}, namely let $S=\left\{\{1,2\},\{1,3\},\{1,4\},\{2,3\},\{2,4\},\{3,4\}\right\}$ be the aforementioned set.

By defining the complementary cofactors to be

$$b_{\{j,k\}}=\begin{vmatrix} a_{1j} & a_{1k} \\  a_{2j} & a_{2k} \end{vmatrix},$$
$$c_{\{p,q\}}=\begin{vmatrix} a_{3p} & a_{3q} \\  a_{4p} & a_{4q} \end{vmatrix},$$

and the sign of their permutation to be

$$\varepsilon^{\{j,k\},\{p,q\}} = \sgn\begin{bmatrix} 1 & 2 & 3 & 4 \\  j & k & p & q \end{bmatrix}, \text{ where } p\neq j,q\neq k.$$

The determinant of A can be written out as

$$|A| = \sum_{H \in S} \varepsilon^{H,H^\prime}b_{H}c_{H^\prime},$$

where $H^{\prime}$ is the complementary set to $H$.

In our explicit example this gives us

$$\begin{align}
|A| &=  b_{\{1,2\}}c_{\{3,4\}} -b_{\{1,3\}}c_{\{2,4\}} +b_{\{1,4\}}c_{\{2,3\}}+b_{\{2,3\}}c_{\{1,4\}} -b_{\{2,4\}}c_{\{1,3\}} +b_{\{3,4\}}c_{\{1,2\}} \\[5pt]
&= \begin{vmatrix} 1 & 2 \\ 5 & 6 \end{vmatrix} \cdot \begin{vmatrix} 11 & 12 \\ 15 & 16 \end{vmatrix}
- \begin{vmatrix} 1 & 3 \\ 5 & 7 \end{vmatrix} \cdot \begin{vmatrix} 10 & 12 \\ 14 & 16 \end{vmatrix}
+ \begin{vmatrix} 1 & 4 \\ 5 & 8 \end{vmatrix} \cdot \begin{vmatrix} 10 & 11 \\ 14 & 15 \end{vmatrix}
+ \begin{vmatrix} 2 & 3 \\ 6 & 7 \end{vmatrix} \cdot \begin{vmatrix}  9 & 12 \\ 13 & 16 \end{vmatrix}
- \begin{vmatrix} 2 & 4 \\ 6 & 8 \end{vmatrix} \cdot \begin{vmatrix}  9 & 11 \\ 13 & 15 \end{vmatrix}
+ \begin{vmatrix} 3 & 4 \\ 7 & 8 \end{vmatrix} \cdot \begin{vmatrix}  9 & 10 \\ 13 & 14 \end{vmatrix}\\[5pt]
&=  -4 \cdot (-4) -(-8)  \cdot (-8) +(-12) \cdot (-4) +(-4)  \cdot (-12) -(-8)  \cdot (-8) +(-4)  \cdot (-4)\\[5pt]
&=  16 - 64 + 48 + 48 - 64 + 16 = 0.
\end{align}$$

As above, it is easy to verify that the result is correct: the matrix is singular because the sum of its first and third column is twice the second column, and hence its determinant is zero.

=== General statement ===
Let $B=[b_{ij}]$ be an n × n matrix and $S$ the set of k-element subsets of {1, 2, ... , n}, $H$ an element in it. Then the determinant of $B$ can be expanded along the k rows identified by $H$ as follows:

$$|B| = \sum_{L\in S} \varepsilon^{H,L} b_{H,L} c_{H,L}$$

where $\varepsilon^{H,L}$ is the sign of the permutation determined by $H$ and $L$, equal to $(-1)^{\left(\sum_{h\in H}h\right) + \left(\sum_{\ell\in L}\ell\right)}$, $b_{H,L}$ the square minor of $B$ obtained by deleting from $B$ rows and columns with indices in $H$ and $L$ respectively, and $c_{H,L}$ (called the complement of $b_{H,L}$) defined to be $b_{H',L'}$ , $H'$ and $L'$ being the complement of $H$ and $L$ respectively.

This coincides with the theorem above when $k=1$. The same thing holds for any fixed k columns.

== Computational complexity ==
The Laplace expansion is computationally inefficient for high-dimension matrices, with a time complexity in big O notation of O(n!). Alternatively, using a decomposition into triangular matrices as in the LU decomposition can yield determinants with a time complexity of O(n^{3}). The following Python code implements the Laplace expansion:

def determinant(M):
    # Base case of recursive function: 1x1 matrix
    if len(M) == 1:
        return M[0][0]

    total = 0
    for column, element in enumerate(M[0]):
        # Exclude first row and current column.
        K = [x[:column] + x[column + 1 :] for x in M[1:]]
        s = 1 if column % 2 == 0 else -1
        total += s * element * determinant(K)
    return total

== See also ==
- Leibniz formula for determinants
- Rule of Sarrus for $3 \times 3$ determinants
