= Determinantal conjecture =

Mathematical conjecture

In mathematics, the determinantal conjecture of Marcus (1972) and de Oliveira (1982) asks whether the determinant of a sum A + B of two n-by-n normal complex matrices A and B lies in the convex hull of the n! points Π_{i} (λ(A)_{i} + λ(B)_{σ(i)}), where the numbers λ(A)_{i} and λ(B)_{i} are the eigenvalues of A and B, and σ is an element of the symmetric group S_{n}.
