= Trudi Trueit =

American author of children's books

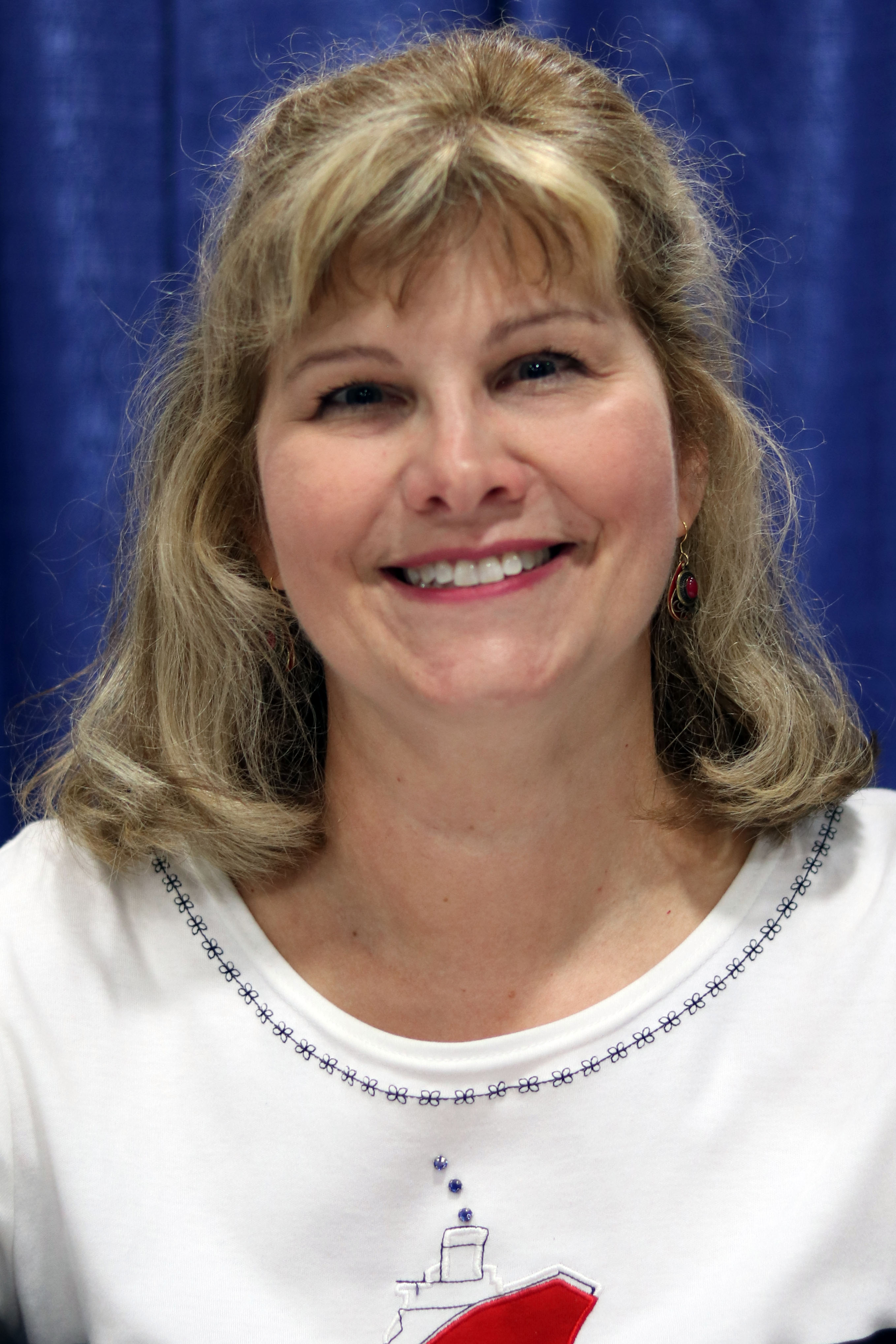
- Trueit at the 2018 U.S. National Book Festival
- Website: www.truditrueit.com

Trudi Trueit is an American author of children's books.

Her work includes a series books for Scholastic Press and National Geographic Kids.

== Personal life ==
Trudi Trueit is an American author, known for her children's fiction and nonfiction titles including the EXPLORER ACADEMY series (National Geographic). Her love for writing started in fourth grade, and she wrote and directed her first play at that her school. She was one of those kids that always had her head in a book. She graduated summa cum laude from Pacific Lutheran University in Tacoma.

== Career ==
In the past, Trueit has worked as a television news reporter, weather forecaster, journalist, media specialist, and news anchor. But she knew her calling was in writing. Her Hobbies and other interests include drawing, painting, photography.
