= Claricia =

13th-century German artist

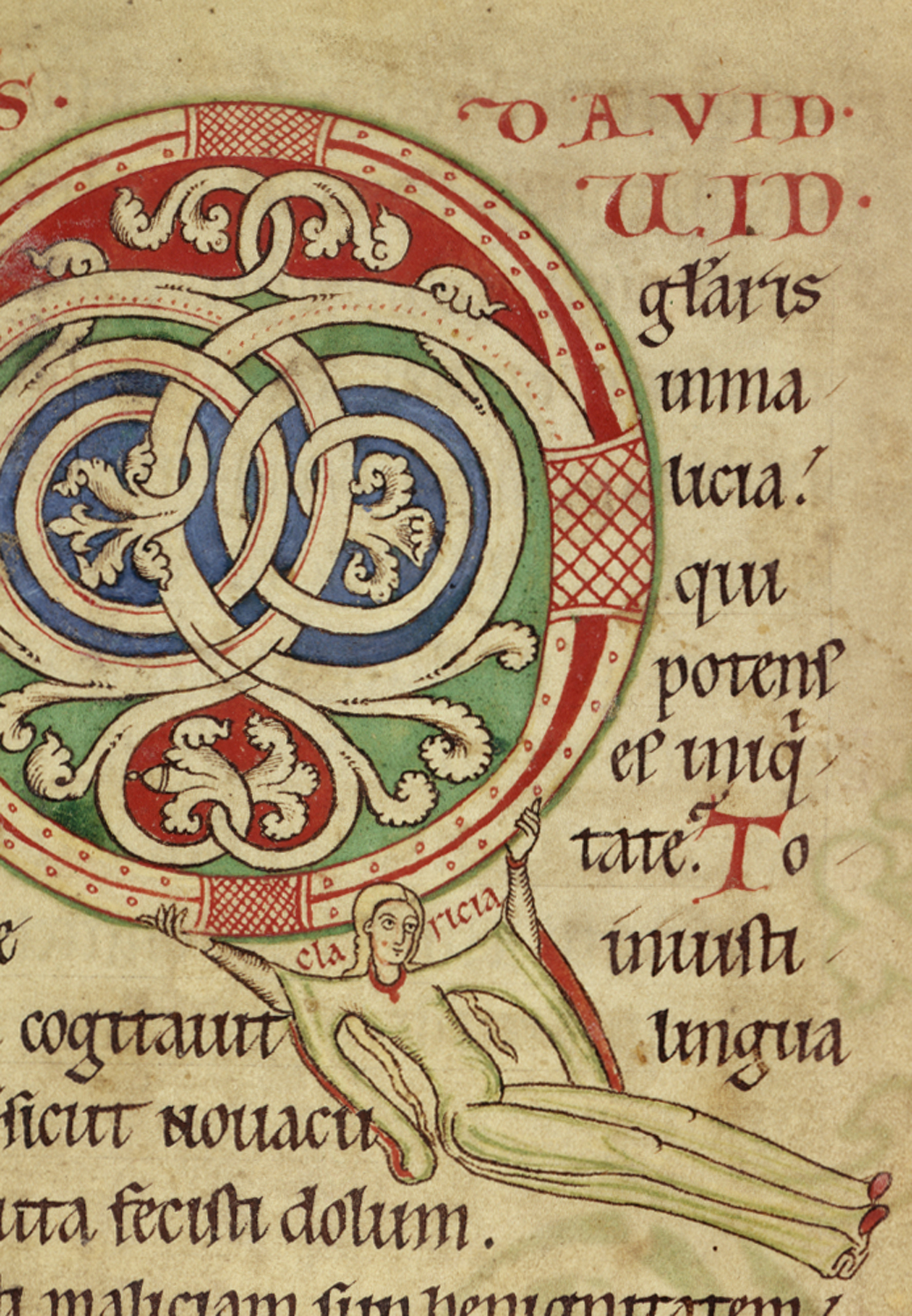
from a psalter on parchment, figure of a woman swinging diagonally over the page forms the tail of the letter Q that begins Psalm 51 (in the counting of the Vulgata, today: Psalm 52) the name, Claricia, is inscribed above her head, Walters Art Museum

Claricia or Clarica was a 13th-century German illuminator. She is noted for including a self-portrait in a South German psalter of around 1200, now in the Walters Art Museum in Baltimore. In the self-portrait, she depicts herself as swinging from a letter Q, forming the tail. Additionally, she inscribed her name over her head.

Feminist studies in the field of literature and medieval art such as Whitney Chadwick and Dorothy Miner uncovered Claricia's work in one of her manuscripts. "Claricia’s hand is just one of several in this manuscript, leading Dorothy Miner to conclude on the basis of her dress – uncovered head, braided hair, and a close-fitting tunic under a long-waisted dress with long tapering points hanging from the sleeves – that she was probably a lay student at the convent."

There is controversy regarding Claricia's occupation. Scholars such as Miner believe that Claricia was a lay woman – possibly a high-born lady – active in a convent scriptorium in Augsburg. Some rejected that she was employed as a convent assistant, noting that the language of the psalm was derogatory.

== See also ==
- List of German women artists
- Guda (nun)
