= Gudas, Belgaum =

Coordinates: 26°29′N 74°46′E

Gudas
- Village
- Interactive map of Gudas
- Country: India
- State: Karnataka
- District: Belgaum
- Talukas: Hukeri

Languages
  - Official: Kannada
- Time zone: UTC+5:30 (IST)

Gudas, Belgaum is a village According to Census 2011 information the location code or village code of Gudas village is 597594. Gudas village is located in Hukeri taluka of Belgaum district in Karnataka, India.
