= Guda (nun) =

12th-century German nun and illuminator

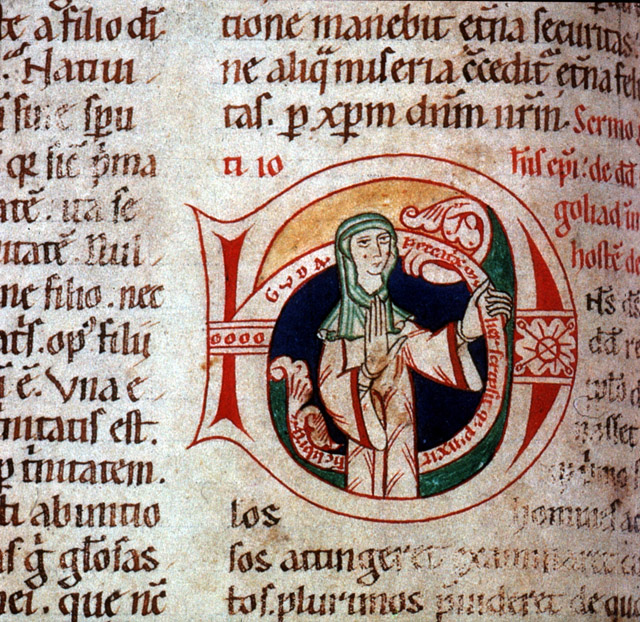
- Known for: Limner
- Patrons: Catholic Church

Guda was a 12th-century nun and illuminator from Germany. She is credited as creating the oldest known example of a signed self-portrait of a woman in an illuminated manuscript. (The manuscript is Frankfurt Universitätsbibliothek Ms. Barth. 42; Guda's portrait appears on folio 110v; the manuscript is posted here.)

== Self-Portrait ==
Guda created a self-portrait in an initial letter in the 12th century Homiliary of St. Bartholomew (now in the Frankfurt am Main Staatsbibliothek). Her self portrait was placed in the ninth homily of St. John Chrysostom, a position ideal for witnessing the Second Coming of Christ. Her inscription, "Guda, a sinner, wrote and painted this book," was used to confess to her sinful way, along with describing herself as an artist in hope of increasing her chance for salvation. In addition to serving as a self-portrait, this illustrated initial can also be considered a portrait signature, identifying Guda as a scribe.

== Legacy ==
Scholars today credit Guda with being one of the first women in western civilization to create a signed self-portrait. Although there may have been other female illuminators such as Claricia, a laywoman in a Bavarian Scriptorium, there is no concrete evidence of her exact involvement they had with these illuminations.

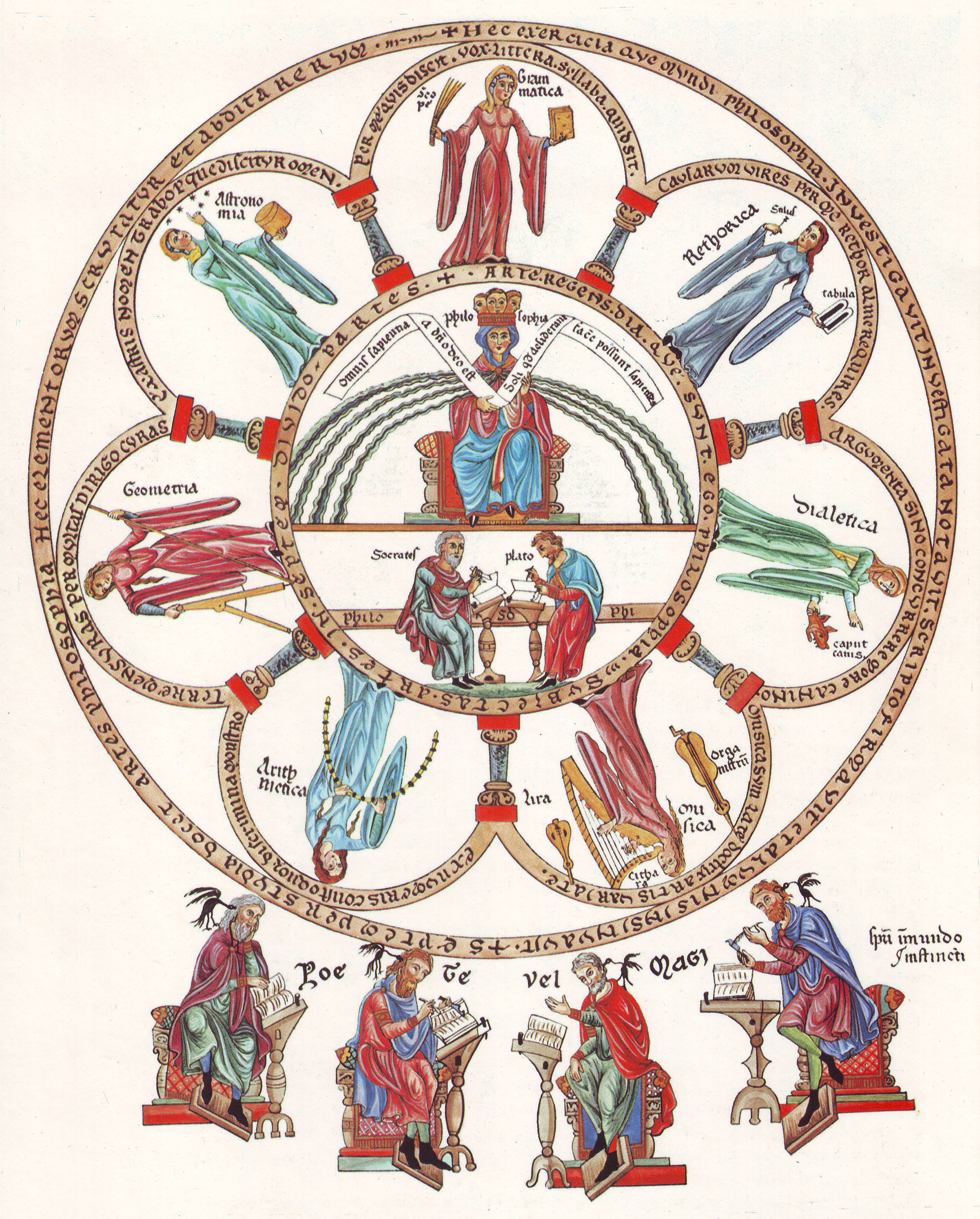
Illustration of the Philosophy and the Seven Liberal Arts in the Hortus deliciarum.

Later female involvement in manuscript writing and illuminations is seen with Herrad of Landsberg and her work on the Hortus deliciarum. Herrad's proof of her authorship is consistent on this manuscript. Herrad chose which religious texts to omit and include depending on her liking, and editing sources to make the manuscript more accessible for the nuns of the Hohenbourg Abbey. Criticisms of the clergy as seen in the removed depiction of hell that she attempted to include. This demonstrates the increased evidence regarding women's contributions to manuscript creation and illumination after Guda's portrait. Later female contributions to manuscripts such as illuminations in manuscripts from nuns at St. Maria Magdalena put themselves at the center in various religious works.
