= Leibniz formula for determinants =

Mathematics formula

In algebra, the Leibniz formula, named in honor of Gottfried Leibniz, expresses the determinant of a square matrix in terms of permutations of the matrix elements. If $A$ is an $n \times n$ matrix, where $a_{ij}$ is the entry in the $i$-th row and $j$-th column of $A$, the formula is

$$\det(A) = \sum_{\tau \in S_n} \sgn(\tau) \prod_{i = 1}^n a_{i\tau(i)} = \sum_{\sigma \in S_n} \sgn(\sigma) \prod_{i = 1}^n a_{\sigma(i)i}$$

where $\sgn$ is the sign function of permutations in the permutation group $S_n$, which returns $+1$ and $-1$ for even and odd permutations, respectively.

Another common notation used for the formula is in terms of the Levi-Civita symbol and makes use of the Einstein summation notation, where it becomes

$$\det(A) = \epsilon_{i_1\cdots i_n} {a}_{1i_1} \cdots {a}_{ni_n},$$

which may be more familiar to physicists.

Directly evaluating the Leibniz formula from the definition requires $\Omega(n! \cdot n)$ operations in general—that is, a number of operations asymptotically proportional to $n$ factorial—because $n!$ is the number of order-$n$ permutations. This is impractically difficult for even relatively small $n$. Instead, the determinant can be evaluated in $O(n^3)$ operations by forming the LU decomposition $A = LU$ (typically via Gaussian elimination or similar methods), in which case $\det A = \det L \cdot \det U$ and the determinants of the triangular matrices $L$ and $U$ are simply the products of their diagonal entries. (In practical applications of numerical linear algebra, however, explicit computation of the determinant is rarely required.) See, for example, Trefethen & Bau (1997). The determinant can also be evaluated in fewer than $O(n^3)$ operations by reducing the problem to matrix multiplication, but most such algorithms are not practical.

== Formal statement and proof ==
Theorem. There exists exactly one function $F : M_n (\mathbb K) \rightarrow \mathbb K$ which is alternating multilinear with respect to columns and such that $F(I) = 1$.

Proof.

Uniqueness: Let $F$ be such a function, and let $A = (a_i^j)_{i = 1, \dots, n}^{j = 1, \dots , n}$ be an $n \times n$ matrix. Call $A^j$ the $j$-th column of $A$, i.e. $A^j = (a_i^j)_{i = 1, \dots , n}$, so that $A = \left(A^1, \dots, A^n\right).$

Also, let $E^k$ denote the $k$-th column vector of the identity matrix.

Now one writes each of the $A^j$'s in terms of the $E^k$, i.e.

$$A^j = \sum_{k = 1}^n a_k^j E^k$$.

As $F$ is multilinear, one has

$$\begin{align}
F(A)& = F\left(\sum_{k_1 = 1}^n a_{k_1}^1 E^{k_1}, \dots, \sum_{k_n = 1}^n a_{k_n}^n E^{k_n}\right) = \sum_{k_1, \dots, k_n = 1}^n \left(\prod_{i = 1}^n a_{k_i}^i\right) F\left(E^{k_1}, \dots, E^{k_n}\right).
\end{align}$$

From alternation it follows that any term with repeated indices is zero. The sum can therefore be restricted to tuples with non-repeating indices, i.e. permutations:

$$F(A) = \sum_{\sigma \in S_n} \left(\prod_{i = 1}^n a_{\sigma(i)}^i\right) F(E^{\sigma(1)}, \dots , E^{\sigma(n)}).$$

Because F is alternating, the columns $E$ can be swapped until it becomes the identity. The sign function $\sgn(\sigma)$ is defined to count the number of swaps necessary and account for the resulting sign change. One finally gets:

$$\begin{align}
F(A)& = \sum_{\sigma \in S_n} \sgn(\sigma) \left(\prod_{i = 1}^n a_{\sigma(i)}^i\right) F(I)\\
& = \sum_{\sigma \in S_n} \sgn(\sigma) \prod_{i = 1}^n a_{\sigma(i)}^i
\end{align}$$

as $F(I)$ is required to be equal to $1$.

Therefore no function besides the function defined by the Leibniz Formula can be a multilinear alternating function with $F\left(I\right)=1$.

Existence: We now show that F, where F is the function defined by the Leibniz formula, has these three properties.

Multilinear:

$$\begin{align}
F(A^1, \dots, cA^j, \dots) & = \sum_{\sigma \in S_n} \sgn(\sigma) ca_{\sigma(j)}^j\prod_{i = 1, i \neq j}^n a_{\sigma(i)}^i\\
& = c \sum_{\sigma \in S_n} \sgn(\sigma) a_{\sigma(j)}^j\prod_{i = 1, i \neq j}^n a_{\sigma(i)}^i\\
&=c F(A^1, \dots, A^j, \dots)\\
\\
F(A^1, \dots, b+A^j, \dots) & = \sum_{\sigma \in S_n} \sgn(\sigma)\left(b_{\sigma(j)} + a_{\sigma(j)}^j\right)\prod_{i = 1, i \neq j}^n a_{\sigma(i)}^i\\
& = \sum_{\sigma \in S_n} \sgn(\sigma)
\left( \left(b_{\sigma(j)}\prod_{i = 1, i \neq j}^n a_{\sigma(i)}^i\right) + \left(a_{\sigma(j)}^j\prod_{i = 1, i \neq j}^n a_{\sigma(i)}^i\right)\right)\\
& = \left(\sum_{\sigma \in S_n} \sgn(\sigma) b_{\sigma(j)}\prod_{i = 1, i \neq j}^n a_{\sigma(i)}^i\right)
+ \left(\sum_{\sigma \in S_n} \sgn(\sigma) \prod_{i = 1}^n a_{\sigma(i)}^i\right)\\
&= F(A^1, \dots, b, \dots) + F(A^1, \dots, A^j, \dots)\\
\\
\end{align}$$

Alternating:

$$\begin{align}
F(\dots, A^{j_1}, \dots, A^{j_2}, \dots)
& = \sum_{\sigma \in S_n} \sgn(\sigma) \left(\prod_{i = 1, i \neq j_1, i\neq j_2}^n a_{\sigma(i)}^i\right) a_{\sigma(j_1)}^{j_1} a_{\sigma(j_2)}^{j_2}\\
\end{align}$$

For any $\sigma \in S_n$ let $\sigma'$ be the tuple equal to $\sigma$ with the $j_1$ and $j_2$ indices switched.

$$\begin{align}
F(A) & = \sum_{\sigma\in S_{n},\sigma(j_{1})<\sigma(j_{2})}\left[\sgn(\sigma)\left(\prod_{i = 1, i \neq j_1, i\neq j_2}^na_{\sigma(i)}^{i}\right)a_{\sigma(j_{1})}^{j_{1}}a_{\sigma(j_{2})}^{j_{2}}+\sgn(\sigma')\left(\prod_{i = 1, i \neq j_1, i\neq j_2}^na_{\sigma'(i)}^{i}\right)a_{\sigma'(j_{1})}^{j_{1}}a_{\sigma'(j_{2})}^{j_{2}}\right]\\
& =\sum_{\sigma\in S_{n},\sigma(j_{1})<\sigma(j_{2})}\left[\sgn(\sigma)\left(\prod_{i = 1, i \neq j_1, i\neq j_2}^na_{\sigma(i)}^{i}\right)a_{\sigma(j_{1})}^{j_{1}}a_{\sigma(j_{2})}^{j_{2}}-\sgn(\sigma)\left(\prod_{i = 1, i \neq j_1, i\neq j_2}^na_{\sigma(i)}^{i}\right)a_{\sigma(j_{2})}^{j_{1}}a_{\sigma(j_{1})}^{j_{2}}\right]\\
& =\sum_{\sigma\in S_{n},\sigma(j_{1})<\sigma(j_{2})}\sgn(\sigma)\left(\prod_{i = 1, i \neq j_1, i\neq j_2}^na_{\sigma(i)}^{i}\right)\underbrace{\left(a_{\sigma(j_{1})}^{j_{1}}a_{\sigma(j_{2})}^{j_{2}}-a_{\sigma(j_{1})}^{j_{2}}a_{\sigma(j_{2})}^{j_{_{1}}}\right)}_{=0\text{, if }A^{j_1}=A^{j_2}}\\
\\
\end{align}$$

Thus if $A^{j_1} = A^{j_2}$ then $F(\dots, A^{j_1}, \dots, A^{j_2}, \dots)=0$.

Finally, $F(I)=1$:

$$\begin{align}
F(I) & = \sum_{\sigma \in S_n} \sgn(\sigma) \prod_{i = 1}^n I^i_{\sigma(i)}
= \sum_{\sigma \in S_n} \sgn(\sigma) \prod_{i = 1}^n \operatorname{\delta}_{i,\sigma(i)}\\
& = \sum_{\sigma \in S_n} \sgn(\sigma) \operatorname{\delta}_{\sigma,\operatorname{id}_{\{1\ldots n\}}}
= \sgn(\operatorname{id}_{\{1\ldots n\}})
= 1
\end{align}$$

Thus the only alternating multilinear functions with $F(I)=1$ are restricted to the function defined by the Leibniz formula, and it in fact also has these three properties. Hence the determinant can be defined as the only function $\det : M_n (\mathbb K) \rightarrow \mathbb K$ with these three properties.

== See also ==
- Matrix
- Laplace expansion
- Cramer's rule
