= Vincas Ramutis Gudaitis =

Lithuanian politician (born 1941)

Vincas Ramutis Gudaitis (born 8 December 1941) is a Lithuanian politician. In 1990 he was among those who signed the Act of the Re-Establishment of the State of Lithuania.
