= Trudi Guda =

Surinamese poet & anthropologist

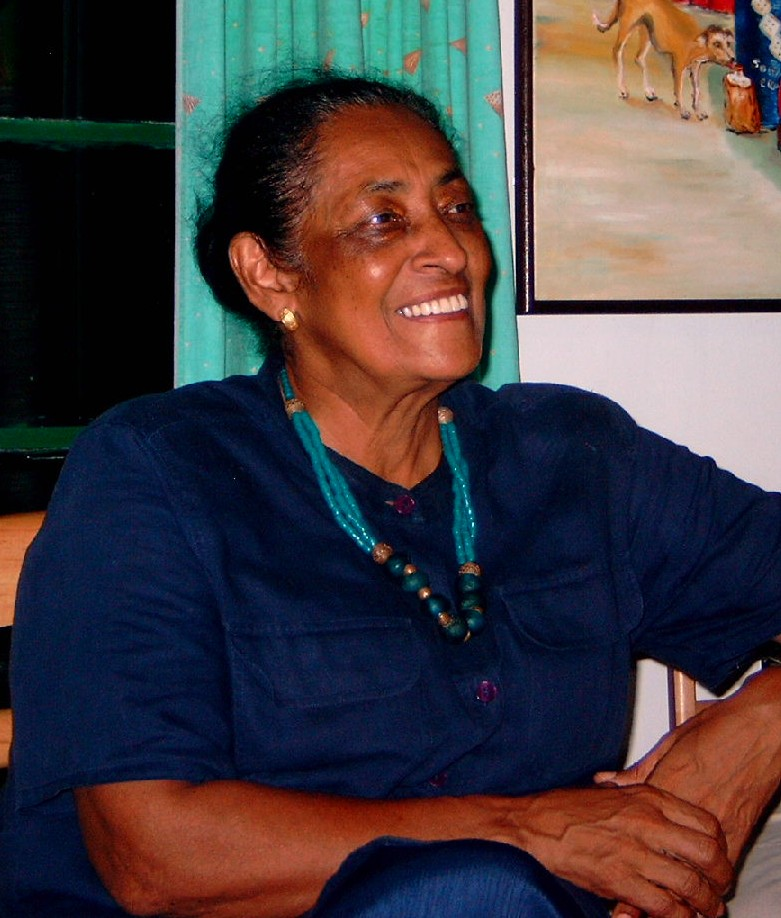
Trudi Guda in 2005

Gertrude (Trudi) Marie Guda (born 4 December 1940, in Paramaribo) is a Surinamese poet and anthropologist. She headed the Department of Cultural Affairs of Suriname from 1969 to 1971. She studied in the Netherlands and was inspired by Miguel Barnet's writing a biography of Esteban Montejo.
