= Rank–nullity theorem =

In linear algebra, relation between 3 dimensions

Rank–nullity theorem

The rank–nullity theorem is a theorem in linear algebra, which asserts:

- the number of columns of a matrix M is the sum of the rank of M and the nullity of M; and
- the dimension of the domain of a linear transformation f is the sum of the rank of f (the dimension of the image of f) and the nullity of f (the dimension of the kernel of f).

It follows that for linear transformations of vector spaces of equal finite dimension, either injectivity or surjectivity implies bijectivity.

== Stating the theorem ==
=== Linear transformations ===
Let $T : V \to W$ be a linear transformation between two vector spaces where $T$'s domain $V$ is finite dimensional. Then
$$\operatorname{rank}(T) ~+~ \operatorname{nullity}(T) ~=~ \dim V,$$
where $\operatorname{rank}(T)$ is the rank of $T$ (the dimension of its image) and $\operatorname{nullity}(T)$ is the nullity of $T$ (the dimension of its kernel). In other words,
$$\dim (\operatorname{Im} T) + \dim (\operatorname{Ker} T) = \dim (\operatorname{Domain}(T)).$$
This theorem can be refined via the splitting lemma to be a statement about an isomorphism of spaces, not just dimensions. Explicitly, since $T$ induces an isomorphism from $V / \operatorname{Ker} (T)$ to $\operatorname{Im} (T),$ the existence of a basis for $V$ that extends any given basis of $\operatorname{Ker}(T)$ implies, via the splitting lemma, that $\operatorname{Im}(T) \oplus \operatorname{Ker}(T) \cong V.$ Taking dimensions, the rank–nullity theorem follows.

=== Matrices ===
Linear maps can be represented with matrices. More precisely, an $m\times n$ matrix M represents a linear map $f:F^n\to F^m,$ where $F$ is the underlying field. So, the dimension of the domain of $f$ is n, the number of columns of M, and the rank–nullity theorem for an $m\times n$ matrix M is
$$\operatorname{rank}(M) + \operatorname{nullity}(M) = n.$$

== Proofs ==
Here we provide two proofs. The first operates in the general case, using linear maps. The second proof looks at the homogeneous system $\mathbf{Ax} = \mathbf{0},$ where $\mathbf{A}$ is a $m\times n$ with rank $r,$ and shows explicitly that there exists a set of $n-r$ linearly independent solutions that span the null space of $\mathbf{A}$.

While the theorem requires that the domain of the linear map be finite-dimensional, there is no such assumption on the codomain. This means that there are linear maps not given by matrices for which the theorem applies. Despite this, the first proof is not actually more general than the second: since the image of the linear map is finite-dimensional, we can represent the map from its domain to its image by a matrix, prove the theorem for that matrix, then compose with the inclusion of the image into the full codomain.

=== First proof ===
Let $V, W$ be vector spaces over some field $F,$ and $T$ defined as in the statement of the theorem with $\dim V = n$.

As $\operatorname{Ker}T \subset V$ is a subspace, there exists a basis for it. Suppose $\dim\operatorname{Ker}T = k$ and let
$$\mathcal{K} := \{v_1, \ldots, v_k\} \subset \operatorname{Ker}(T)$$
be such a basis.

By the Steinitz exchange lemma, there is a linearly independent set $\mathcal{S} = \{w_1, \ldots, w_{n-k}\}$ of $n-k$ vectors such that the union $\mathcal{B} = \mathcal{K} \cup \mathcal{S} = \{v_1, \ldots, v_k, w_1, \ldots, w_{n-k}\}$ is a basis of $V$. From this, it follows
$$\begin{align}
\operatorname{Im} T & = \operatorname{Span}T(\mathcal{B}) = \operatorname{Span}\{T(v_1), \ldots, T(v_k), T(w_1), \ldots, T(w_{n-k})\} \\
& = \operatorname{Span}\{T(w_1), \ldots, T(w_{n-k})\} = \operatorname{Span}T(\mathcal{S}) .
\end{align}$$
We now claim that $T(\mathcal{S})$ is a basis for $\operatorname{Im} T$. The above equality already states that $T(\mathcal{S})$ is a generating set for $\operatorname{Im} T$; it remains to be shown that it is also linearly independent to conclude that it is a basis.

To this end, consider a linear combination
$$\sum_{j=1}^{n-k} \alpha _j T(w_j) = 0_W$$
for some $\alpha _j \in F$. We must show that all the coefficients $\alpha_j$ are equal to $0$. Owing to the linearity of $T$, it follows that
$$T \left(\sum_{j=1}^{n-k} \alpha _j w_j \right) = 0_W,$$
and therefore that
$$\left(\sum_{j=1}^{n-k} \alpha _j w_j \right) \in \operatorname{Ker} T = \operatorname{Span} \mathcal{K}.$$
Therefore, there are coefficents $\beta_1, \ldots, \beta_k$ such that $\sum_{j=1}^{n-k} \alpha _j w_j = \sum_{i = 1}^k \beta_i v_i$, and so that $\sum_{j=1}^{n-k} \alpha _j w_j - \sum_{i = 1}^k \beta_i v_i = 0_V$. This last relation expresses $0_V$ as a linear combination of the basis $\mathcal{B}$; since $\mathcal{B}$ is a basis, all the coefficients $\alpha _j$ are equal to zero. This shows that $T(\mathcal{S})$ is linearly independent, and more specifically that it is a basis for $\operatorname{Im}T$.

To summarize, we have $\mathcal{K}$, a basis for $\operatorname{Ker}T$, and $T(\mathcal{S})$, a basis for $\operatorname{Im}T$.

Finally we may state that
$$\operatorname{Rank}(T) + \operatorname{Nullity}(T) = \dim \operatorname{Im} T + \dim \operatorname{Ker}T$$

$$= |T(\mathcal{S})| + |\mathcal{K}| = (n-k) + k = n = \dim V .$$

This concludes our proof.

=== Second proof ===
Let $\mathbf{A}$ be an $m\times n$ matrix with $r$ linearly independent columns (i.e. $\operatorname{Rank}(\mathbf{A}) = r$). We will show that:

1. There exists a set of $n - r$ linearly independent solutions to the homogeneous system $\mathbf{Ax} = \mathbf{0}$.
2. That every other solution is a linear combination of these $n-r$ solutions.

To do this, we will produce an $n \times (n-r)$ matrix $\mathbf{X}$ whose columns form a basis of the null space of $\mathbf{A}$.

Without loss of generality, assume that the first $r$ columns of $\mathbf{A}$ are linearly independent. So, we can write
$$\mathbf{A} = \begin{pmatrix} \mathbf{A}_1 & \mathbf{A}_2\end{pmatrix} ,$$
where

- $\mathbf{A}_1$ is an $m \times r$ matrix with $r$ linearly independent column vectors, and
- $\mathbf{A}_2$ is an $m\times (n-r)$ matrix such that each of its $n-r$ columns is linear combinations of the columns of $\mathbf{A}_1$.

This means that $\mathbf{A}_2 = \mathbf{A}_1\mathbf{B}$ for some $r \times (n-r)$ matrix $\mathbf{B}$ (see rank factorization) and, hence,
$$\mathbf{A} = \begin{pmatrix} \mathbf{A}_1 & \mathbf{A}_1\mathbf{B}\end{pmatrix} .$$

Let
$$\mathbf{X} = \begin{pmatrix} -\mathbf{B} \\ \mathbf{I}_{n-r} \end{pmatrix} ,$$
where $\mathbf{I}_{n-r}$ is the $(n-r)\times (n-r)$ identity matrix. So, $\mathbf{X}$ is an $n \times (n-r)$ matrix such that
$$\mathbf{A}\mathbf{X} = \begin{pmatrix}\mathbf{A}_1 & \mathbf{A}_1\mathbf{B} \end{pmatrix}\begin{pmatrix} -\mathbf{B} \\ \mathbf{I}_{n-r} \end{pmatrix} = -\mathbf{A}_1\mathbf{B} + \mathbf{A}_1\mathbf{B} = \mathbf{0}_{m \times (n-r)}.$$

Therefore, each of the $n-r$ columns of $\mathbf{X}$ are particular solutions of $\mathbf{Ax} = {0}_{{F}^{m}}$.

Furthermore, the $n-r$ columns of $\mathbf{X}$ are linearly independent because $\mathbf{Xu} = \mathbf{0}_{{F}^{n}}$ will imply $\mathbf{u} = \mathbf{0}_{{F}^{n-r}}$ for $\mathbf{u} \in {F}^{n-r}$:
$$\mathbf{X}\mathbf{u} = \mathbf{0}_{{F}^{n}} \implies \begin{pmatrix}
-\mathbf{B} \\
\mathbf{I}_{n-r}
\end{pmatrix}\mathbf{u} = \mathbf{0}_{{F}^{n}} \implies \begin{pmatrix}
-\mathbf{B}\mathbf{u} \\
\mathbf{u}
\end{pmatrix} = \begin{pmatrix}
\mathbf{0}_{{F}^{r}} \\
\mathbf{0}_{{F}^{n-r}}
\end{pmatrix} \implies \mathbf{u} = \mathbf{0}_{{F}^{n-r}}.$$
Therefore, the column vectors of $\mathbf{X}$ constitute a set of $n-r$ linearly independent solutions for $\mathbf{Ax} = \mathbf{0}_{\mathbb{F}^{m}}$.

We next prove that any solution of $\mathbf{Ax} = \mathbf{0}_{{F}^{m}}$ must be a linear combination of the columns of $\mathbf{X}$.

For this, let
$$\mathbf{u} = \begin{pmatrix}
\mathbf{u}_1 \\
\mathbf{u}_2
\end{pmatrix} \in {F}^{n}$$

be any vector such that $\mathbf{Au} = \mathbf{0}_{{F}^{m}}$. Since the columns of $\mathbf{A}_1$ are linearly independent, $\mathbf{A}_1\mathbf{x} = \mathbf{0}_{{F}^{m}}$ implies $\mathbf{x} = \mathbf{0}_{{F}^{r}}$.

Therefore,
$$\begin{array}{rcl}
\mathbf{A}\mathbf{u} & = & \mathbf{0}_{{F}^{m}} \\
\implies \begin{pmatrix}\mathbf{A}_1 & \mathbf{A}_1\mathbf{B}\end{pmatrix} \begin{pmatrix} \mathbf{u}_1 \\ \mathbf{u}_2 \end{pmatrix} & = & \mathbf{A}_1\mathbf{u}_1 + \mathbf{A}_1\mathbf{B}\mathbf{u}_2 & = & \mathbf{A}_1(\mathbf{u}_1 + \mathbf{B}\mathbf{u}_2) & = & \mathbf{0}_{\mathbb{F}^{m}} \\
\implies \mathbf{u}_1 + \mathbf{B}\mathbf{u}_2 & = & \mathbf{0}_{{F}^{r}} \\
\implies \mathbf{u}_1 & = & -\mathbf{B}\mathbf{u}_2
\end{array}$$
$$\implies \mathbf{u} = \begin{pmatrix} \mathbf{u}_1 \\ \mathbf{u}_2 \end{pmatrix}
= \begin{pmatrix} -\mathbf{B} \\ \mathbf{I}_{n-r} \end{pmatrix}\mathbf{u}_2
= \mathbf{X}\mathbf{u}_2.$$

This proves that any vector $\mathbf{u}$ that is a solution of $\mathbf{Ax} = \mathbf{0}$ must be a linear combination of the $n-r$ special solutions given by the columns of $\mathbf{X}$. And we have already seen that the columns of $\mathbf{X}$ are linearly independent. Hence, the columns of $\mathbf{X}$ constitute a basis for the null space of $\mathbf{A}$. Therefore, the nullity of $\mathbf{A}$ is $n - r$. Since $r$ equals rank of $\mathbf{A}$, it follows that $\operatorname{Rank}(\mathbf{A}) + \operatorname{Nullity}(\mathbf{A}) = n$. This concludes our proof.

== A third fundamental subspace ==
When $T: V \to W$ is a linear transformation between two finite-dimensional subspaces, with $n = \dim(V)$ and $m = \dim(W)$ (so can be represented by an $m \times n$ matrix $M$), the rank–nullity theorem asserts that if $T$ has rank $r$, then $n - r$ is the dimension of the null space of $M$, which represents the kernel of $T$. In some texts, a third fundamental subspace associated to $T$ is considered alongside its image and kernel: the cokernel of $T$ is the quotient space $W / \operatorname{Im}(T)$, and its dimension is $m - r$. This dimension formula (which might also be rendered $\dim \operatorname{Im}(T) + \dim\operatorname{Coker}(T) = \dim(W)$) together with the rank–nullity theorem is sometimes called the fundamental theorem of linear algebra.

== Reformulations and generalizations ==
This theorem is a statement of the first isomorphism theorem of algebra for the case of vector spaces; it generalizes to the splitting lemma.

In more modern language, the theorem can also be phrased as saying that each short exact sequence of vector spaces splits. Explicitly, given that
$$0 \rightarrow U \rightarrow V \mathbin{\overset{T}{\rightarrow}} R \rightarrow 0$$
is a short exact sequence of vector spaces, then $U \oplus R \cong V$, hence
$$\dim(U) + \dim(R) = \dim(V) .$$
Here $R$ plays the role of $\operatorname{Im} T$ and $U$ is $\operatorname{Ker}T$, i.e.
$$0 \rightarrow \ker T \mathbin{\hookrightarrow} V \mathbin{\overset{T}{\rightarrow}} \operatorname{im} T \rightarrow 0$$

In the finite-dimensional case, this formulation is susceptible to a generalization: if
$$0 \rightarrow V_1 \rightarrow V_2 \rightarrow \cdots \rightarrow V_r \rightarrow 0$$
is an exact sequence of finite-dimensional vector spaces, then
$$\sum_{i=1}^r (-1)^i\dim(V_i) = 0.$$
The rank–nullity theorem for finite-dimensional vector spaces may also be formulated in terms of the index of a linear map. The index of a linear map $T \in \operatorname{Hom}(V,W)$, where $V$ and $W$ are finite-dimensional, is defined by
$$\operatorname{index} T = \dim \operatorname{Ker}(T) - \dim \operatorname{Coker} T .$$

Intuitively, $\dim \operatorname{Ker} T$ is the number of independent solutions $v$ of the equation $Tv = 0$, and $\dim \operatorname{Coker} T$ is the number of independent restrictions that have to be put on $w$ to make $Tv = w$ solvable. The rank–nullity theorem for finite-dimensional vector spaces is equivalent to the statement
$$\operatorname{index} T = \dim V - \dim W .$$

We see that we can easily read off the index of the linear map $T$ from the involved spaces, without any need to analyze $T$ in detail. This effect also occurs in a much deeper result: the Atiyah–Singer index theorem states that the index of certain differential operators can be read off the geometry of the involved spaces.
