= Log-rank conjecture =

Unsolved problem in theoretical computer science

In theoretical computer science, the log-rank conjecture states that the deterministic communication complexity of a two-party Boolean function is polynomially related to the logarithm of the rank of its input matrix.

Let $D(f)$ denote the deterministic communication complexity of a function, and let $\operatorname{rank}(f)$ denote the rank of its input matrix $M_f$ (over the reals). Since every protocol using up to $c$ bits partitions $M_f$ into at most $2^c$ monochromatic rectangles, and each of these has rank at most 1,

$$D(f) \geq \log_2 \operatorname{rank}(f).$$

The log-rank conjecture states that $D(f)$ is also upper-bounded by a polynomial in the log-rank: for some constant $C$,

$$D(f) = O((\log \operatorname{rank}(f))^C).$$

Lovett proved the upper bound

$$D(f) = O\left(\sqrt{\operatorname{rank}(f)} \log \operatorname{rank}(f)\right).$$

This was improved by Sudakov and Tomon, who removed the logarithmic factor, showing that

$$D(f) = O\left(\sqrt{\operatorname{rank}(f)}\right).$$

This is the best currently known upper bound.

The best known lower bound, due to Göös, Pitassi and Watson, states that $C \geq 2$. In other words, there exists a sequence of functions $f_n$, whose log-rank goes to infinity, such that

$$D(f_n) = \tilde\Omega((\log \operatorname{rank}(f_n))^2).$$

In 2019, an approximate version of the conjecture for randomised communication has been disproved.

== See also ==
- List of unsolved problems in computer science
