= Interpolative decomposition =

In numerical analysis, interpolative decomposition (ID) factors a matrix as the product of two matrices, one of which contains selected columns from the original matrix, and the other of which has a subset of columns consisting of the identity matrix and all its values are no greater than 2 in absolute value.

== Definition ==
Let $A$ be an $m \times n$ matrix of rank $r$. The matrix $A$ can be written as

$$A = A_{(:,J)} X , \,$$

where

- $J$ is a subset of $r$ indices from $\{ 1 ,\ldots, n \};$
- The $m \times r$ matrix $A_{(:,J)}$ represents $J$'s columns of $A;$
- $X$ is an $r \times n$ matrix, all of whose values are less than 2 in magnitude. $X$ has an $r \times r$ identity submatrix.

Note that a similar decomposition can be done using the rows of $A$ instead of its columns.

== Example ==
Let $A$ be the $3 \times 3$ matrix of rank 2:

$$A =
\begin{bmatrix}
34  &  58  &  52 \\
59  &  89  &  80 \\
17  &  29  &  26
\end{bmatrix}.$$

If

$$J = \begin{bmatrix}
2  & 1
\end{bmatrix},$$

then

$$A =
\begin{bmatrix}
58  & 34 \\
89  & 59 \\
29  & 17
\end{bmatrix}
\begin{bmatrix}
0  &  1  &  \frac{29}{33} \\
1  &  0  &  \frac{1}{33}
\end{bmatrix} \approx
\begin{bmatrix}
58  & 34 \\
89  & 59 \\
29  & 17
\end{bmatrix}
\begin{bmatrix}
0  &  1  &  0.8788 \\
1  &  0  &  0.0303
\end{bmatrix}.$$
