= Splitting lemma =

About direct sums and exact sequences

In mathematics, and more specifically in homological algebra, the splitting lemma states that in any abelian category, the following statements are equivalent for a short exact sequence
$$0 \longrightarrow A \mathrel{\overset{q}{\longrightarrow}} B \mathrel{\overset{r}{\longrightarrow}} C \longrightarrow 0.$$

1. Left split
  There exists a morphism t: B → A such that tq is the identity id_{A} on A,
2. Right split
  There exists a morphism u: C → B such that ru is the identity id_{C} on C,
3. Direct sum
  There is an isomorphism h from B to the direct sum of A and C, such that hq is the natural injection of A into the direct sum, and $rh^{-1}$ is the natural projection of the direct sum onto C.

If any of these statements holds, the sequence is called a split exact sequence, and the sequence is said to split.

In the above short exact sequence, where the sequence splits, it allows one to refine the first isomorphism theorem, which states that:

C ≅ B/ker r ≅ B/q(A) (i.e., C isomorphic to the coimage of r or cokernel of q)

to:

B = q(A) ⊕ u(C) ≅ A ⊕ C

where the first isomorphism theorem is then just the projection onto C.

It is a categorical generalization of the rank–nullity theorem (in the form V ≅ ker T ⊕ im T) in linear algebra.

== Proof for the category of abelian groups ==
=== 3. ⇒ 1. and 3. ⇒ 2. ===
First, to show that 3. implies both 1. and 2., we assume 3. and take as t the natural projection of the direct sum onto A, and take as u the natural injection of C into the direct sum.

=== 1. ⇒ 3. ===
To prove that 1. implies 3., first note that any member of B is in the set (ker t + im q). This follows since for all b in B, b = (b − qt(b)) + qt(b); qt(b) is in im q, and b − qt(b) is in ker t, since

t(b − qt(b)) = t(b) − tqt(b) = t(b) − (tq)t(b) = t(b) − t(b) = 0.

Next, the intersection of im q and ker t is 0, since if there exists a in A such that q(a) = b, and t(b) = 0, then 0 = tq(a) = a; and therefore, b = 0.

This proves that B is the direct sum of im q and ker t. So, for all b in B, b can be uniquely identified by some a in A, k in ker t, such that b = q(a) + k.

By exactness ker r = im q. The subsequence B ⟶ C ⟶ 0 implies that r is onto; therefore for any c in C there exists some b = q(a) + k such that c = r(b) = r(q(a) + k) = r(k). Therefore, for any c in C, exists k in ker t such that c = r(k), and r(ker t) = C.

If r(k) = 0, then k is in im q; since the intersection of im q and ker t = 0, then k = 0. Therefore, the restriction r: ker t → C is an isomorphism; and ker t is isomorphic to C.

Finally, im q is isomorphic to A due to the exactness of 0 ⟶ A ⟶ B; so B is isomorphic to the direct sum of A and C, which proves (3).

=== 2. ⇒ 3. ===
To show that 2. implies 3., we follow a similar argument. Any member of B is in the set ker r + im u; since for all b in B, b = (b − ur(b)) + ur(b), which is in ker r + im u. The intersection of ker r and im u is 0, since if r(b) = 0 and u(c) = b, then 0 = ru(c) = c.

By exactness, im q = ker r, and since q is an injection, im q is isomorphic to A, so A is isomorphic to ker r. Since ru is a bijection, u is an injection, and thus im u is isomorphic to C. So B is again the direct sum of A and C.

An alternative "abstract nonsense" proof of the splitting lemma may be formulated entirely in category theoretic terms.

== Non-abelian groups ==
In the form stated here, the splitting lemma does not hold in the full category of groups, which is not an abelian category.

=== Partially true ===
It is partially true: if a short exact sequence of groups is left split or a direct sum (1. or 3.), then all of the conditions hold. For a direct sum this is clear, as one can inject from or project to the summands. For a left split sequence, the map t × r: B → A × C gives an isomorphism, so B is a direct sum (3.), and thus inverting the isomorphism and composing with the natural injection C → A × C gives an injection C → B splitting r (2.).

However, if a short exact sequence of groups is right split (2.), then it need not be left split or a direct sum (neither 1. nor 3. follows): the problem is that the image of the right splitting need not be normal. What is true in this case is that B is a semidirect product, though not in general a direct product.

=== Counterexample ===
To form a counterexample, take the smallest non-abelian group B ≅ S_{3}, the symmetric group on three letters. Let A denote the alternating subgroup, and let C = B/A ≅ {±1}. Let q and r denote the inclusion map and the sign map respectively, so that

$$0 \longrightarrow A \mathrel{\stackrel{q}{\longrightarrow}} B \mathrel{\stackrel{r}{\longrightarrow}} C \longrightarrow 0$$

is a short exact sequence. 3. fails, because S_{3} is not abelian, but 2. holds: we may define u: C → B by mapping the generator to any two-cycle. Note for completeness that 1. fails: any map t: B → A must map every two-cycle to the identity because the map has to be a group homomorphism, while the order of a two-cycle is 2 which can not be divided by the order of the elements in A other than the identity element, which is 3 as A is the alternating subgroup of S_{3}, or namely the cyclic group of order 3. But every permutation is a product of two-cycles, so t is the trivial map, whence tq: A → A is the trivial map, not the identity.
