= Nonnegative rank (linear algebra) =

In linear algebra, the nonnegative rank of a nonnegative matrix is a concept similar to the usual linear rank of a real matrix, but adding the requirement that certain coefficients and entries of vectors/matrices have to be nonnegative.

For example, the linear rank of a matrix is the smallest number of vectors, such that every column of the matrix can be written as a linear combination of those vectors. For the nonnegative rank, it is required that the vectors must have nonnegative entries, and also that the coefficients in the linear combinations are nonnegative.

== Formal definition ==
There are several equivalent definitions, all modifying the definition of the linear rank slightly. Apart from the definition given above, there is the following: The nonnegative rank of a nonnegative m×n-matrix A is equal to the smallest number q such there exists a nonnegative m×q-matrix B and a nonnegative q×n-matrix C such that A = BC (the usual matrix product). To obtain the linear rank, drop the condition that B and C must be nonnegative.

Further, the nonnegative rank is the smallest number of nonnegative rank-one matrices into which the matrix can be decomposed additively:

$\mbox{rank}_+(A) = \min\{ q \mid \sum_{j=1}^q R_j = A, \; \mbox{rank}\,R_1=\dots=\mbox{rank}\,R_q =1, \; R_1,\dots,R_q \ge 0\},$

where R_{j} ≥ 0 stands for "R_{j} is nonnegative". (To obtain the usual linear rank, drop the condition that the R_{j} have to be nonnegative.)

Given a nonnegative $m \times n$ matrix A the nonnegative rank $rank_+(A)$ of A satisfies

$\mbox{rank}\,(A) \leq \mbox{rank}_+(A) \leq \min(m,n),$ where $\mbox{rank}\,(A)$ denotes the usual linear rank of A.

=== A Fallacy ===
The rank of the matrix A is the largest number of columns which are linearly independent, i.e., none of the selected columns can be written as a linear combination of the other selected columns. It is not true that adding nonnegativity to this characterization gives the nonnegative rank: The nonnegative rank is in general less than or equal to the largest number of columns such that no selected column can be written as a nonnegative linear combination of the other selected columns.

== Connection with the linear rank ==
It is always true that rank(A) ≤ rank_{+}(A). In fact rank_{+}(A) = rank(A) holds whenever rank(A) ≤ 2.

In the case rank(A) ≥ 3, however, rank(A) < rank_{+}(A) is possible. For example, the matrix

$$\mathbf{A} = \begin{bmatrix}
1 & 1 & 0 & 0\\
1 & 0 & 1 & 0\\
0 & 1 & 0 & 1\\
0 & 0 & 1 & 1 \end{bmatrix},$$

satisfies rank(A) = 3 < 4 = rank_{+}(A).

These two results (including the 4×4 matrix example above) were first provided by Thomas in a response to a question posed in 1973 by Berman and Plemmons.

== Computing the nonnegative rank ==
The nonnegative rank of a matrix can be determined algorithmically, but no efficient algorithm is expected to exist, because it has been proved that determining whether ${{\text{rank}}_+}(A)= \text{rank}(A)$ is NP-hard.

Obvious questions concerning the complexity of nonnegative rank computation remain unanswered to date. For example, the complexity of determining the nonnegative rank of matrices of fixed rank k is unknown for k > 2.

== Ancillary facts ==
Nonnegative rank has important applications in Combinatorial optimization: The minimum number of facets of an extension of a polyhedron P is equal to the nonnegative rank of its so-called slack matrix.
