= Rank factorization =

Concept in linear algebra

In mathematics, given a field $\mathbb F$, non-negative integers $m,n$, and a matrix $A\in\mathbb F^{m\times n}$, a rank decomposition or rank factorization of A is a factorization of A of the form A = CF, where $C\in\mathbb F^{m\times r}$ and $F\in\mathbb F^{r\times n}$, where $r=\operatorname{rank} A$ is the rank of $A$.

== Existence ==
Every finite-dimensional matrix has a rank decomposition: Let $A$ be an $m\times n$ matrix whose column rank is $r$. Therefore, there are $r$ linearly independent columns in $A$; equivalently, the dimension of the column space of $A$ is $r$. Let $\mathbf{c}_1, \mathbf{c}_2, \ldots, \mathbf{c}_r$ be any basis for the column space of $A$ and place them as column vectors to form the $m\times r$ matrix
$$C = \begin{bmatrix}\mathbf{c}_1 & \mathbf{c}_2 & \cdots & \mathbf{c}_r\end{bmatrix}$$
. Therefore, every column vector of $A$ is a linear combination of the columns of $C$. To be precise, if
$$A = \begin{bmatrix}\mathbf{a}_1 & \mathbf{a}_2 & \cdots & \mathbf{a}_n\end{bmatrix}$$
is an $m\times n$ matrix with $\mathbf{a}_j$ as the $j$-th column, then

$$\mathbf{a}_j = f_{1j} \mathbf{c}_1 + f_{2j} \mathbf{c}_2 + \cdots + f_{rj} \mathbf{c}_r,$$

where $f_{ij}$'s are the scalar coefficients of $\mathbf{a}_j$ in terms of the basis $\mathbf{c}_1, \mathbf{c}_2, \ldots, \mathbf{c}_r$. This implies that $A = CF$, where $f_{ij}$ is the $(i,j)$-th element of $F$.

== Non-uniqueness ==
If $A = C_1 F_1$ is a rank factorization, taking $C_2 = C_1 R$ and $F_2 = R^{-1} F_1$ gives another rank factorization for any invertible matrix $R$ of compatible dimensions.

Conversely, if $A = F_{1}G_{1} = F_{2}G_{2}$ are two rank factorizations of $A$, then there exists an invertible matrix $R$ such that $F_1 = F_2 R$ and $G_1 = R^{-1} G_{2}$.

== Construction ==
=== Rank factorization from reduced row echelon forms ===
In practice, we can construct one specific rank factorization as follows: we can compute $B$, the reduced row echelon form of $A$. Then $C$ is obtained by removing from $A$ all non-pivot columns (which can be determined by looking for columns in $B$ which do not contain a pivot), and $F$ is obtained by eliminating any all-zero rows of $B$.

Note: For a full-rank square matrix (i.e. when $n=m=r$), this procedure will yield the trivial result $C=A$ and $F=B=I_n$ (the $n\times n$ identity matrix).

==== Example ====
Consider the matrix

$$A = \begin{bmatrix} 1 & 3 & 1 & 4 \\ 2 & 7 & 3 & 9 \\ 1 & 5 & 3 & 1 \\ 1 & 2 & 0 & 8 \end{bmatrix}
\sim \begin{bmatrix} 1 & 0 & -2 & 0 \\ 0 & 1 & 1 & 0 \\ 0 & 0 & 0 & 1 \\ 0 & 0 & 0 & 0 \end{bmatrix}
= B\text{.}$$

$B$ is in reduced echelon form.

Then $C$ is obtained by removing the third column of $A$, the only one which is not a pivot column, and $F$ by getting rid of the last row of zeroes from $B$, so

$$C = \begin{bmatrix} 1 & 3 & 4 \\ 2 & 7 & 9 \\ 1 & 5 & 1 \\ 1 & 2 & 8 \end{bmatrix}\text{,}\qquad
F = \begin{bmatrix} 1 & 0 & -2 & 0 \\ 0 & 1 & 1 & 0 \\ 0 & 0 & 0 & 1 \end{bmatrix}\text{.}$$

It is straightforward to check that

$$A = \begin{bmatrix} 1 & 3 & 1 & 4 \\ 2 & 7 & 3 & 9 \\ 1 & 5 & 3 & 1 \\ 1 & 2 & 0 & 8 \end{bmatrix}
= \begin{bmatrix} 1 & 3 & 4 \\ 2 & 7 & 9 \\ 1 & 5 & 1 \\ 1 & 2 & 8 \end{bmatrix}
\begin{bmatrix} 1 & 0 & -2 & 0 \\ 0 & 1 & 1 & 0 \\ 0 & 0 & 0 & 1 \end{bmatrix}
= CF\text{.}$$

==== Proof ====
Let $P$ be an $n\times n$ permutation matrix such that $AP = (C, D)$ in block partitioned form, where the columns of $C$ are the $r$ pivot columns of $A$. Every column of $D$ is a linear combination of the columns of $C$, so there is a matrix $G$ such that $D = CG$, where the columns of $G$ contain the coefficients of each of those linear combinations. So $AP = (C, CG) = C(I_r, G)$, $I_r$ being the $r\times r$ identity matrix. We will show now that $(I_r, G) = FP$.

Transforming $A$ into its reduced row echelon form $B$ amounts to left-multiplying by a matrix $E$ which is a product of elementary matrices, so $EAP = BP = EC(I_r, G)$, where
$$EC = \begin{pmatrix} I_r \\ 0 \end{pmatrix}$$
. We then can write
$$BP = \begin{pmatrix} I_r & G \\ 0 & 0 \end{pmatrix}$$
, which allows us to identify $(I_r, G) = FP$, i.e. the nonzero $r$ rows of the reduced echelon form, with the same permutation on the columns as we did for $A$. We thus have $AP = CFP$, and since $P$ is invertible this implies $A = CF$, and the proof is complete.

=== Singular value decomposition ===
If $\mathbb F\in\{\mathbb R,\mathbb C\},$ then one can also construct a full-rank factorization of $A$ via a singular value decomposition

$$A = U \Sigma V^*
= \begin{bmatrix} U_1 & U_2 \end{bmatrix} \begin{bmatrix} \Sigma_r & 0 \\ 0 & 0 \end{bmatrix} \begin{bmatrix} V_1^* \\ V_2^* \end{bmatrix}
= U_1 \left(\Sigma_r V_1^*\right) .$$

Since $U_1$ is a full-column-rank matrix and $\Sigma_r V_1^*$ is a full-row-rank matrix, we can take $C = U_1$ and $F = \Sigma_r V_1^*$.

== Consequences ==
=== rank(A) = rank(A^{T}) ===
An immediate consequence of rank factorization is that the rank of $A$ is equal to the rank of its transpose $A^\textsf{T}$. Since the columns of $A$ are the rows of $A^\textsf{T}$, the column rank of $A$ equals its row rank.

Proof: To see why this is true, let us first define rank to mean column rank. Since $A = CF$, it follows that $A^\textsf{T} = F^\textsf{T}C^\textsf{T}$. From the definition of matrix multiplication, this means that each column of $A^\textsf{T}$ is a linear combination of the columns of $F^\textsf{T}$. Therefore, the column space of $A^\textsf{T}$ is contained within the column space of $F^\textsf{T}$ and, hence, $\operatorname{rank}\left(A^\textsf{T}\right) \leq \operatorname{rank}\left(F^\textsf{T}\right)$.

Now, $F^\textsf{T}$ is $n \times r$, so there are $r$ columns in $F^\textsf{T}$ and, hence, $\operatorname{rank}\left(A^\textsf{T}\right) \leq r = \operatorname{rank}\left(A\right)$. This proves that $\operatorname{rank}\left(A^\textsf{T}\right) \leq \operatorname{rank}\left(A\right)$.

Now apply the result to $A^\textsf{T}$ to obtain the reverse inequality: since $\left(A^\textsf{T}\right)^\textsf{T} = A$, we can write $\operatorname{rank}\left(A\right)= \operatorname{rank}\left(\left(A^\textsf{T}\right)^\textsf{T}\right) \leq \operatorname{rank}\left(A^\textsf{T}\right)$. This proves $\operatorname{rank}\left(A\right) \leq \operatorname{rank}\left(A^\textsf{T}\right)$.

We have, therefore, proved $\operatorname{rank}\left(A^\textsf{T}\right) \leq \operatorname{rank}\left(A\right)$ and $\operatorname{rank}\left(A\right) \leq \operatorname{rank}\left(A^\textsf{T}\right)$, so $\operatorname{rank}\left(A\right) = \operatorname{rank}\left(A^\textsf{T}\right)$.
