= Steinitz exchange lemma =

Extension of independent vectors to bases

The Steinitz exchange lemma is a theorem in linear algebra concerning bases, dimensionality of a vector space, stating that for any set smaller than a spanning set, there is a set of vectors in the spanning set but missing from the smaller set that can be added to the smaller set to make that set spanning as well.

It can be used, for example, to show that any two bases for a finite-dimensional vector space have the same number of elements. The result is named after the German mathematician Ernst Steinitz. The result is often called the Steinitz–Mac Lane exchange lemma, also recognizing the generalization by Saunders Mac Lane of Steinitz's lemma to matroids.

== Statement ==
Let $U$ and $W$ be finite subsets of a vector space $V$. If $U$ is a set of linearly independent vectors, and $W$ spans $V$, then:

1. $|U| \leq |W|$;

2. There is a set $W' \subseteq W$ with $|W'|=|W|-|U|$ such that $U \cup W'$ spans $V$.

== Proof ==
Suppose $U=\{u_1, \dots, u_m\}$ and $W=\{w_1, \dots, w_n\}$. Linear independence assumption on $U$ implies that its elements are non-zero vectors. It is enough to show that the condition 2. holds under the assumption that $m \le n$ because this implies the necessity of the condition 1. Indeed, if one assumes $m \ge n+1$ for a contradiction then $U' :=\{u_1, \dots, u_n\}$ spans $V$ (by the validity of the condition 2. for $m \le n$) and $u_{n+1}$is in the linear hull of $U'$, contradicting the linear independence of $U$ .

We fix $n$ and proceed by induction on $m=0,\ldots,n$. We wish to show that, after rearranging the $w_j$ if necessary, the set $\{u_1, \dotsc, u_m, w_{m + 1}, \dotsc, w_n\}$ spans $V$.

For the base case, suppose $m$ is zero. In this case, the claim holds because there are no vectors $u_i$, and the set $\{w_1, \dotsc, w_n\}$ spans $V$ by hypothesis.

For the inductive step, assume the proposition is true for $m-1$. By the inductive hypothesis we may reorder the $w_i$ so that $\{ u_1,\ldots, u_{m-1},w_{m},\ldots,w_n\}$ spans $V$. Since $u_{m}\in V$, there exist coefficients $\mu_1, \ldots, \mu_n$ such that

$$u_{m}=\sum_{i=1}^{m-1} \mu_i u_i+\sum_{j=m}^n \mu_j w_j$$.

At least one of the $\mu_j$ for $j \ge m$ must be non-zero, since otherwise this equality would contradict the linear independence of $\{ u_1,\ldots,u_{m} \}$. By reordering $\mu_{m}w_{m},\ldots,\mu_{n}w_n$ if necessary, we may assume that $\mu_{m}$ is nonzero. Therefore, we have

$$w_{m}= \frac{1}{\mu_{m}}\left(u_{m} - \sum_{j=1}^{m-1} \mu_j u_j - \sum_{j=m+1}^n \mu_j w_j\right)$$.

In other words, $w_{m}$ is in the span of $\{ u_1,\ldots, u_{m},w_{m+1},\ldots,w_n\}$. Since this span contains each of the vectors $u_1, \ldots, u_{m-1}, w_{m}, w_{m+1}, \ldots, w_n$, by the inductive hypothesis it contains $V$.

== Applications ==
The Steinitz exchange lemma is a basic result in computational mathematics, especially in linear algebra and in combinatorial algorithms.
