= List of fellows of the Fields Institute =

Fellowship of the Fields Institute
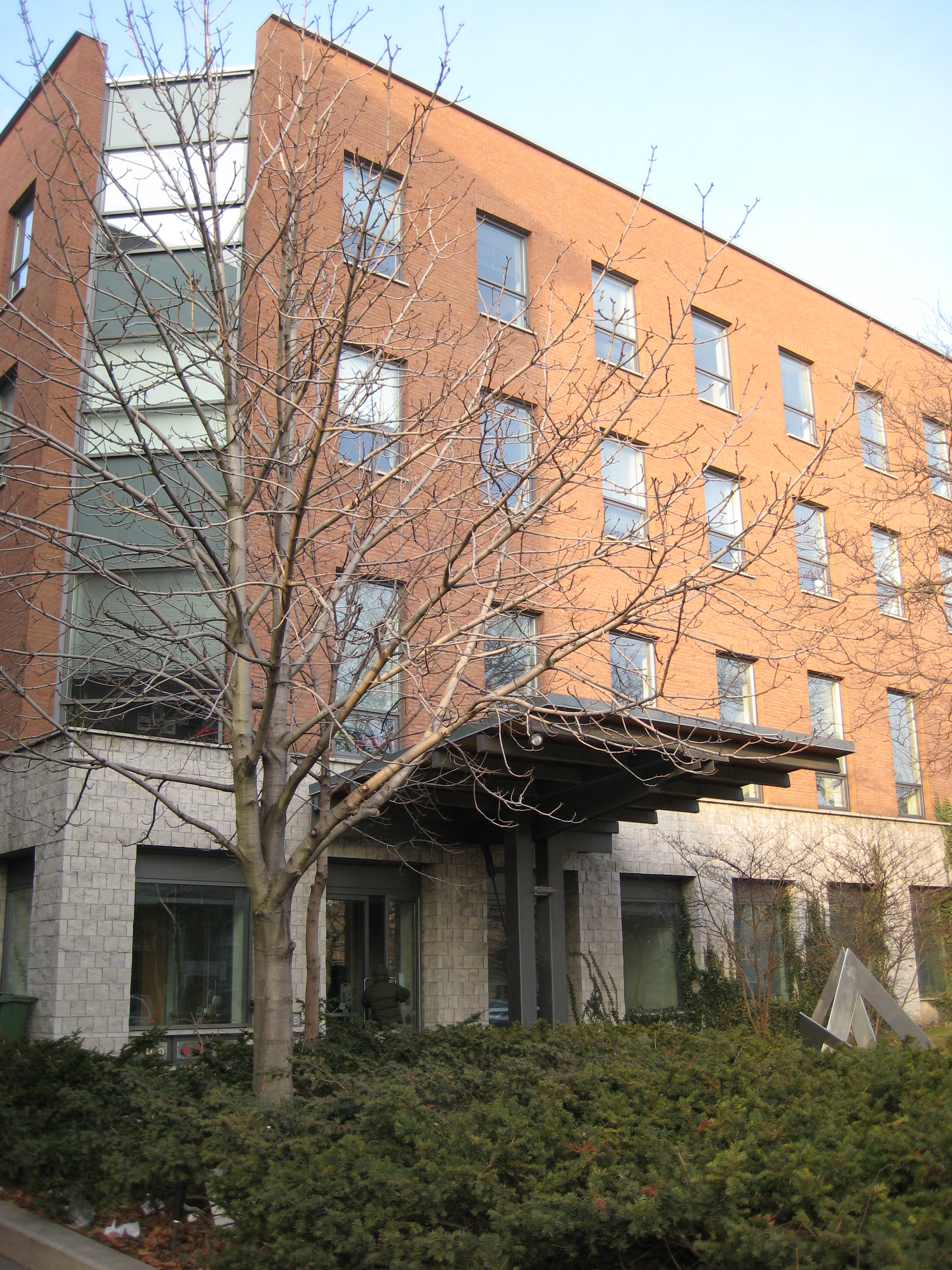
- The exterior of the Fields Institute in Toronto
- Awarded for: "outstanding contributions to the Fields Institute and its activities"
- Sponsored by: Fields Institute
- Date: 2002
- Location: Toronto
- Country: Canada
- Website: fields.utoronto.ca/honours-and-fellowships/fields-institute-fellows

In 2002, the Fields Institute initiated its fellowship program to recognize outstanding contributions to activities at the Fields Institute and within the Canadian mathematical community. The following is a list of fellows of the Fields Institute by year of appointment.

== Fellows ==
Year	Fellow	Affiliation	Field	Born	Died	Refs
2002	James Arthur	University of Toronto		1944		
2002	Edward Bierstone	University of Toronto		1946		
2002	David Brillinger	University of California, Berkeley	Statistics	1937		
2002	Arthur Carty	National Research Council		1940		
2002	John Chadam	University of Pittsburgh				
2002	Stephen Cook	University of Toronto	Complexity theory	1939		
2002	H. S. M. Coxeter	University of Toronto	Geometry	1907	2003	
2002	George A. Elliott	University of Toronto		1945		
2002	Peter Fillmore	Dalhousie University				
2002	John Friedlander	University of Toronto				
2002	J. Alan George	University of Waterloo	Computer science	1943		
2002	Mark Goresky	Institute for Advanced Study	Topology	1950		
2002	Stephen Halperin	University of Maryland		1942		
2002	Vaughan Jones	University of California, Berkeley		1952	2020	
2002	Richard Kane	University of Western Ontario	Algebraic topology	1944	2010	
2002	Manfred Kolster	McMaster University				
2002	Peter Lancaster	University of Calgary		1929		
2002	William Langford	University of Guelph				
2002	François Lalonde	Université de Montréal		1955		
2002	Jerrold E. Marsden	California Institute of Technology		1942	2010	
2002	Moshe Milevsky	York University		1967		
2002	Robert Moody	University of Alberta		1941		
2002	Eric Muller	Brock University				
2002	Peter J. Nicholson	OECD				
2002	Josef Paldus	University of Waterloo	Applied mathematics	1935		
2002	Nicholas Pippenger	University of British Columbia	Computer science			
2002	Carl Riehm	McMaster University				
2002	Tom Salisbury	York University	Probability			
2002	Luis A. Seco	Sigma Analysis & Management	Mathematical finance			
2002	William F. Shadwick	Finance Development Centre				
2002	Israel Michael Sigal	University of Toronto	Mathematical physics			
2002	Victor Snaith	University of Southampton				
2002	James Stewart	McMaster University	Analysis	1941	2014	
2003	Gila Hanna	Ontario Institute for Studies in Education	Mathematics education			
2003	Ed Perkins	University of British Columbia	Probability	1953		
2003	Anna Lawniczak	University of Guelph				
2003	William R. Pulleyblank	IBM	Operations research			
2003	John McKay	Concordia University	Group theory	1939		
2003	Nancy Reid	University of Toronto	Statistics	1952		
2003	V. Kumar Murty	University of Toronto	Number theory	1956		
2004	Derek Corneil	University of Toronto	Graph theory	1942		
2004	Donald A. Dawson	McGill University	Probability	1937		
2004	Bradd Hart	McMaster University	Logic			
2004	M. Ram Murty	Queen's University	Number theory	1953		
2004	Claudine Simson	Motorola, Inc.				
2004	Juris Steprāns	York University		1953		
2005	David William Boyd	University of British Columbia	Analysis	1941		
2005	Walter Craig	McMaster University	Analysis	1953	2019	
2005	Lisa Jeffrey	University of Toronto				
2005	John Mighton	JUMP	Mathematics education	1957		
2005	Tamás Terlaky	McMaster University				
2006	Hermann Brunner	Memorial University of Newfoundland				
2006	Kenneth Davidson	University of Waterloo		1951		
2006	George Gadanidis	University of Western Ontario	Mathematics education			
2006	David Rudd	Sigma Analysis & Management				
2006	Nicole Tomczak-Jaegermann	University of Alberta	Analysis			
2006	Noriko Yui	Queen's University	Algebraic geometry			
2007	Ron Dembo	Zerofootprint				
2007	Joel Feldman	University of British Columbia	Mathematical physics	1949		
2007	Huaxiong Huang	York University				
2007	George O'Brien	York University	Probability	1944	2018	
2007	Amit Oza	Princess Margaret Hospital				
2007	Sivabal Sivaloganathan	University of Waterloo	Applied mathematics			
2008	Allan Borodin	University of Toronto	Computer science	1941		
2008	Jennifer Tour Chayes	Microsoft Research		1951		
2008	Rick Jardine	University of Western Ontario	Homotopy theory			
2008	Angus Macintyre	University of Oxford	Logic	1941		
2008	Cameron Leigh Stewart	University of Waterloo				
2008	Karen Uhlenbeck	University of Texas		1942		
2009	Martin Barlow	University of British Columbia		1953		
2009	Stephen Kudla	University of Toronto		1950		
2009	Izabella Łaba	University of British Columbia		1966		
2009	Catherine Sulem	University of Toronto		1957		
2009	Radford de Peiza		Mathematics education			
2009	Larry Rice		Mathematics education			
2010	Tom Hurd	McMaster University				
2010	Elaine Riehm					
2010	Dan Rosen	R² Financial Technologies, Inc.				
2010	Michael Shub	University of Toronto		1943		
2010	Gordon Douglas Slade	University of British Columbia	Probability	1955		
2011	Mark A. Lewis	University of Alberta	Mathematical biology	1962		
2011	Grigory Margulis	Yale University		1946		
2011	Dragana Martinovic	University of Windsor	Mathematics education			
2011	Éva Tardos	Cornell University		1957		
2011	Jianhong Wu	York University	Applied mathematics	1964		
2012	Nantel Bergeron	York University				
2012	Matthias Neufang	Carleton University				
2012	Margaret P. Sinclair	York University	Mathematics education	1950	2012	
2012	Stevo Todorčević	University of Toronto	Logic	1955		
2012	Matt Valeriote	McMaster University				
2012	Stephen M. Watt	University of Western Ontario				
2013	Jean-Pierre Bourguignon	Institut des hautes études scientifiques	Differential geometry	1947		
2013	Barbara Keyfitz	Ohio State University				
2013	Bruce Reed	McGill University	Graph theory			
2013	Patrick Speissegger	McMaster University				
2014	Antoine Deza	McMaster University				
2014	Adrian Nachman	University of Toronto				
2014	Mary E. Thompson	University of Waterloo	Statistics	1944		
2014	Niky Kamran	McGill University		1959		
2014	Peter Taylor	Queen's University				
2014	James S. Wong	Chinney Capital				
2015	Mayer Alvo	University of Ottawa				
2015	Kai Behrend	University of British Columbia	Algebraic geometry			
2015	Matt Davison	University of Western Ontario				
2015	Susan P. Holmes	Stanford University	Biostatistics			
2015	Miroslav Lovric	McMaster University				
2015	Robert McCann	University of Toronto				
2016	John Gardner	Angoss Software				
2016	Janet Halliwell	J. E. Halliwell Associates, Inc.				
2016	John C. Hull	University of Toronto	Mathematical finance			
2016	Claire Voisin	Collège de France	Algebraic geometry	1962		
2016	Daniel Wise	McGill University				
2017	Henri Darmon	McGill University	Number theory	1965		
2017	Nassif Ghoussoub	University of British Columbia		1953		
2017	Matheus Grasselli	McMaster University				
2017	Donna Kotsopoulos	Wilfrid Laurier University				
2017	Robert Prichard	Bank of Montreal		1949		
2018	Thierry Giordano	University of Ottawa				
2018	Megumi Harada	McMaster University				
2018	Robert M. Miura	New Jersey Institute of Technology		1938	2018	
2018	Jeremy Quastel	University of Toronto		1963		
2019	Roberta Buiani	York University				
2019	James Mingo	Queen's University				
2020	Kasra Rafi	University of Toronto				
2020	Dusa McDuff	University of Toronto		1945		
2020	Sebastian Jaimungal	University of Toronto				
2020	Arvind Gupta	University of Toronto				
2021	Almut Burchard	University of Toronto				
2021	Andrew Granville	Université de Montréal		1962		
2021	Vivek Goel	University of Waterloo				
2021	Ian Hambleton	McMaster University				
2021	George Papanicolau	Stanford University				
2021	Gigliola Staffilani	Massachusetts Institute of Technology		1966		
2022	Charmaine Dean	University of Waterloo				
2022	Taha Jaffer	Scotiabank				
2022	Sharmistha Mishra	St. Michael's Hospital				
2022	Neil Seeman	University of Toronto				
2022	Vahid Tarokh	Duke University		1967		
2022	Bálint Virág	University of Toronto		1973		
2023	Ayman Chit	University of Toronto				
2023	Christian Genest	McGill University		1957		
2023	Richard Kenyon	Yale University		1964		
2023	Javad Mashreghi	Université Laval		1968		
2023	Messoud Efendiyev			1953		
2023	Sylvia Serfaty	Courant Institute of Mathematical Sciences		1975		
2024	Robert J. Birgeneau	University of California, Berkeley		1942		
2024	Michael Harris	Columbia University		1954		
2024	Sujatha Ramdorai	University of British Columbia		1962		
2024	Ulrike Tillmann	Oxford University				
