= Leski =

Leski may refer to:

== People ==
- Andreja Leški (born 1997), Slovenian judoka
- Janusz Łęski (born 1930), Polish film director and screenwriter
- Kazimierz Leski (1912–2000), Polish engineer and spy

== Places ==
- Leski, Vinica, North Macedonia
- Lesko County, Subcarpathian Voivodeship, Poland
