= Jean-Yves Le Boudec =

French computer scientist

- Known for: Network calculus
- Awards: IEEE Communications Society William R. Bennett Prize (2008) IEEE Security and Privacy Test-of-Time Award (2021)
- Scientific career
- Fields: Computer science, network calculus, smart grids
- Workplaces: École Polytechnique Fédérale de Lausanne

Jean-Yves Le Boudec is a computer scientist affiliated with the École Polytechnique Fédérale de Lausanne (EPFL). He is known for his contributions to network calculus, a mathematical framework for the deterministic performance analysis of packet networks, and, since the mid-2010s, for research on the real-time monitoring and control of smart grids.

== Research ==
=== Network calculus ===
In a 1998 paper, Le Boudec introduced the "service curve" concept, a central building block of network calculus theory, independently of and concurrently with Cheng-Shang Chang, whose paper on the same concept appeared in the same issue of the same journal.

With Patrick Thiran, Le Boudec co-authored Network Calculus: A Theory of Deterministic Queuing Systems for the Internet (Springer, 2001), which set out network calculus as a min-plus algebraic framework for bounding delay and backlog in packet networks. He continued to publish on network calculus in subsequent decades, including analyses of worst-case delay bounds relevant to time-sensitive networking standards.

=== Smart grids ===
Since the mid-2010s, Le Boudec's research has increasingly concerned the monitoring and real-time control of smart grids. With Mario Paolone, he helped develop a phasor-measurement-unit-based monitoring system deployed on part of EPFL's campus grid, described as a step toward integrating variable renewable generation into low-voltage distribution networks.

== Honors and awards ==
- IEEE Communications Society William R. Bennett Prize (2008), with Božidar Radunović, for "A Unified Framework for Max-Min and Min-Max Fairness With Applications", IEEE/ACM Transactions on Networking, vol. 15, no. 5, pp. 1073–1083, October 2007
- ACM SIGMETRICS Best Paper Award (2009), with Augustin Chaintreau and Nikodin Ristanović, for "The Age of Gossip: Spatial Mean Field Regime"
- ACM CoNEXT Best Paper Award (2012), with Ramin Khalili, Nicolas Gast, Miroslav Popović, and Utkarsh Upadhyay, for "MPTCP is not Pareto-optimal: Performance Issues and a Possible Solution"
- IEEE Security and Privacy Test-of-Time Award (2021), with Reza Shokri, George Theodorakopoulos, and Jean-Pierre Hubaux, for "Quantifying Location Privacy" (IEEE Symposium on Security and Privacy, 2011)

== Selected publications ==
- Le Boudec, J.-Y. (1988). "The MULTIBUS algorithm." Performance Evaluation, 8(1), 1–18. doi:10.1016/0166-5316(88)90009-0
- Le Boudec, J.-Y.; Thiran, P. (2001). Network Calculus: A Theory of Deterministic Queuing Systems for the Internet. Lecture Notes in Computer Science, vol. 2050. Springer. ISBN 978-3-540-42184-9.
- Shokri, R.; Theodorakopoulos, G.; Le Boudec, J.-Y.; Hubaux, J.-P. (2011). "Quantifying Location Privacy." Proceedings of the 2011 IEEE Symposium on Security and Privacy, 247–262.
- Khalili, R.; Gast, N.; Popović, M.; Le Boudec, J.-Y. (2013). "MPTCP is not Pareto-Optimal: Performance Issues and a Possible Solution." IEEE/ACM Transactions on Networking, 21(5), 1651–1665.
- Tabatabaee, S. M.; Bouillard, A.; Le Boudec, J.-Y. (2024). "Worst-Case Delay Analysis of Time-Sensitive Networks With Deficit Round-Robin." IEEE/ACM Transactions on Networking, 32(3), 1967–1982.
- Thomas, L.; Le Boudec, J.-Y. (2024). "Network-calculus service curves of the interleaved regulator." Performance Evaluation, 166, 102443.
