= Ławniczak =

Ławniczak or Lawniczak is a surname of Polish origin. Notable people with the surname include:

- Aleks Ławniczak (born 1999), Polish footballer
- Anna Lawniczak (born 1953), Polish-Canadian mathematician
- Dominick Evans (born as M. Ławniczak), Polish-Irish-American filmmaker and social activist
- Włodzimierz Ławniczak (1959–2011), Polish journalist and television executive
