= Gila Hanna =

Canadian mathematics educator and philosopher of mathematics

Gila Hanna is a Canadian mathematics educator and philosopher of mathematics whose research interests include the nature and educational role of mathematical proofs, and gender in mathematics education. She is professor emerita in the Department of Curriculum, Teaching and Learning at the University of Toronto, affiliated with the Ontario Institute for Studies in Education, the former director of mathematics education at the Fields Institute, and the founder of the Canadian Journal of Mathematics, Science and Technology Education.

== Books ==
Hanna is the author of Contact and Communication: An Evaluation of Bilingual Student Exchange Programs (OISE Press, 1980) and Rigorous Proof in Mathematics Education (OISE Press, 1983). Her numerous edited volumes include:

- Creativity, Thought and Mathematical Proof (edited with Ian Winchester, 1990)
- Towards Gender Equity in Mathematics Education (1996)
- Proof Technology in Mathematics Research and Teaching (edited with David Reid and Michael de Villiers, 2019)

== Recognition ==
Hanna was named a Fields Institute Fellow in 2003. She was the 2020 winner of the Partners in Research Dr. Jonathon Borwein Mathematics Ambassador Award.
