= Margaret P. Sinclair =

Canadian mathematics educator

Margaret Patricia Sinclair (1950–2012) was a Canadian mathematics educator whose research publications included works on the use of dynamic geometry software in mathematics education^{[A]} and the use of blended learning, a combination of traditional teaching and educational technology, in professional development for secondary-school teachers.^{[B]}

== Life and work ==
Sinclair was born on 21 February 1950.

After a year of undergraduate study in economics at the University of Toronto, Sinclair left school, married at age 18, and began working. From 1969 to 1974 she graduated from Toronto Teacher's College (now part of the Ontario Institute for Studies in Education), took correspondence courses through the University of Toronto, and taught at the elementary school level. By 1975 she left work to raise her children, two at the time and later three more.

Continuing her education by correspondence through the University of Waterloo, Sinclair completed a bachelor's degree in 1988 and returned to work as a secondary school teacher, working within the Toronto Catholic District School Board and eventually becoming a school vice principal. She earned a master's degree in education in 1995, through York University, and a Ph.D. in 2001 from the Ontario Institute for Studies in Education.

Beginning in 2001, she taught mathematics education at York University, initially as an associate professor of education and later as a full professor and co-director of the York/Seneca Institute for Math, Science & Technology Education.

She died of cancer on 21 February 2012.

== Recognition ==
Sinclair was posthumously named a fellow of the Fields Institute, in 2012. The Margaret Sinclair Memorial Award Recognizing Innovation and Excellence in Mathematics Education, an annual Canadian mathematics education award administered by the Fields Institute, is named in her honor.

== Selected publications ==
A.	Sinclair, M. P. (2003), "Some implications of the results of a case study for the design of pre-constructed, dynamic geometry sketches and accompanying materials", Educational Studies in Mathematics, 52 (3): 289–317, doi:10.1023/a:1024305603330

B.	Owston, Ronald D.; Sinclair, Margaret; Wideman, Herbert (May 2008), "Blended Learning for Professional Development: An Evaluation of A Program for Middle School Mathematics and Science Teachers", Teachers College Record, 110 (5): 1033–1064, doi:10.1177/016146810811000503
