= Edmund Zieliński =

Polish ice hockey player

- Born: 24 November 1909; Kijewo Królewskie, Russian Empire
- Died: 8 December 1992 (aged 83); Warsaw, Poland
- Position: Centre
- Played for: AZS Poznań
- National team: Poland
- Playing career: 1930–1939

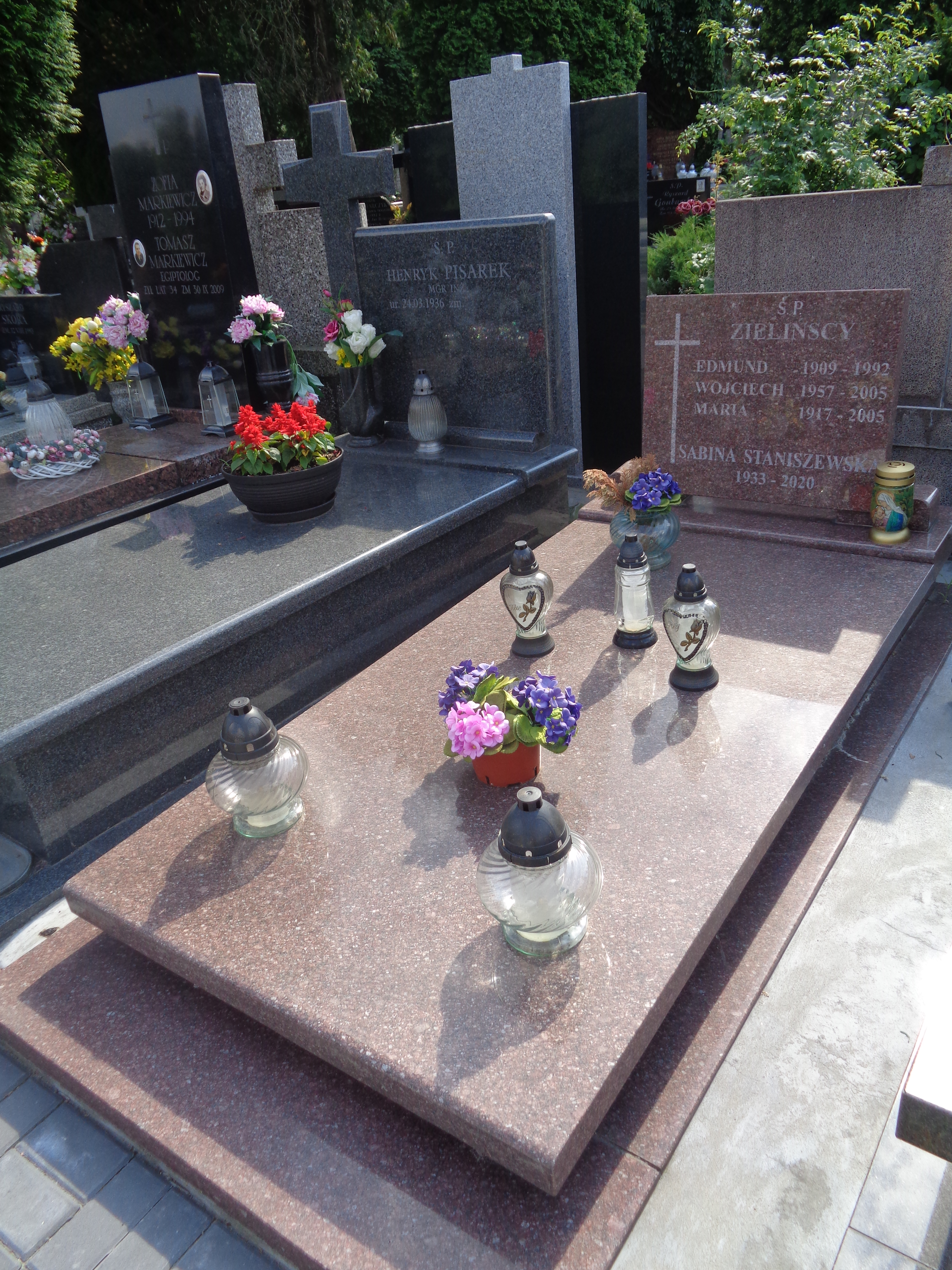
Grave Ice Hockey Edmund Zieliński at the Służew Old Cemetery

Edmund Roman Zieliński (24 November 1909 – 8 December 1992) was a Polish ice hockey player. He played for AZS Poznań during his career, winning the 1934 Polish league championship. He also played for the Polish national team at the 1936 Winter Olympics, and the 1935 World Championship.
