= Służew Old Cemetery =

Cemetery in Warsaw, Poland

Coordinates: 52°10′12″N 21°02′43″E

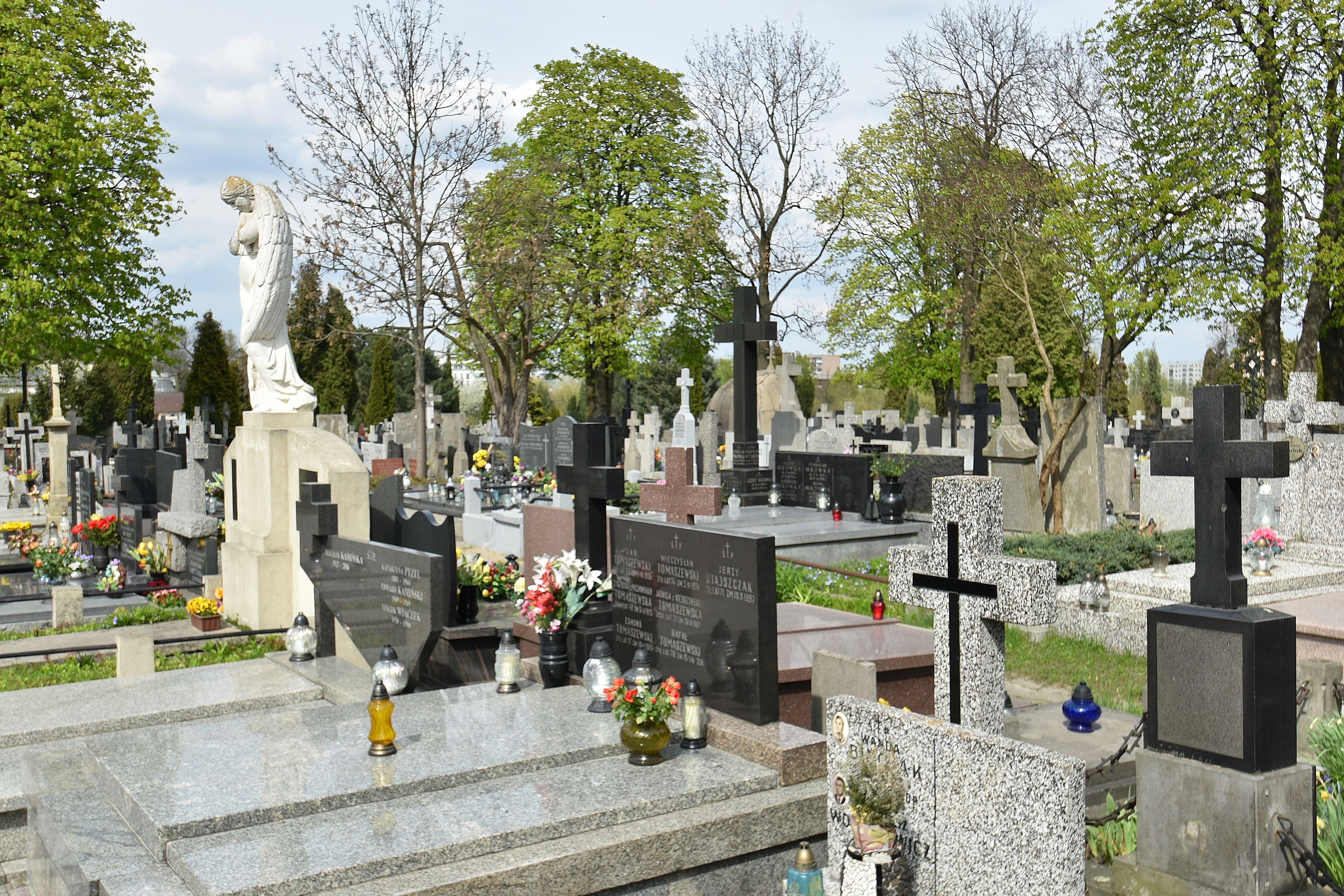
Służew Old Cemetery

The Służew Old Cemetery (Polish: Stary cmentarz na Służewie) is a Roman Catholic cemetery in the area of Stary Służew in the Ursynów district of Warsaw, Poland.

The cemetery is located next to the presbytery of St Catherine's Church at 17 Fosa Street.

== Notable burials ==
- People murdered by military counterintelligence at ul. Krzywicki in the years 1945–1947
- Zbigniew Anusz (1925–2011) – professor of the Medical University of Warsaw, epidemiologist
- Teresa Badzian (1929–1989) – director and screenwriter of animated films
- Wiesław Barej (1934–2000) – veterinarian, professor and dean of the Warsaw University of Life Sciences (SGGW)
- Andrzej Bednarek (1949–2003) – philanthropist, entomologist professor at Warsaw University of Life Sciences
- Jan Blinowski (1939–2002) – physicist, professor of the UW
- Zygmunt Bogacz (1932–1981) – docent at the Warsaw University of Life Sciences
- Krystyna Bolesta–Kukułka (1941–2004) – professor, former dean of Faculty of Management of the University of Warsaw, wife of Józef Kukułka
- Kazimierz Bosek (1932–2006) – journalist, publicist
- Jan Bud–Gusaim (1932–2003) – economist, professor of the Warsaw University of Life Sciences
- Władysław Chrapusta (1896–1982) – journalist, participant in Polish–Bolshevik War
- Hanna Chwalińska–Sadowska (1936–2012) – prof. dr. hab. medical sciences, specialist in rheumatology
- Stanisław Chwaliński (1936–1994) – doc. AM, promoter of preventive medicine
- Antoni Czarnecki (1906–1989) – parson of the parish of St. Catherine (1950–1985)
- Wacław Czarnecki (1902–1990) – journalist, writer and former prisoner of Majdanek and Buchenwald Nazi concentration camps
- Paweł Czartoryski (1924–1999) – lawyer, historian, prof.
- Jerzy Dmochowski (1923–1994) – prof. Warsaw University of Technology
- Marian Dmochowski (1924–2010) – economist, ambassador, undersecretary of state, head of the Ministry of Foreign Trade
- Aleksander Ferenc (1945–2001) – orientalist, prof. UW
- Piotr Figiel (1940–2011) – composer
- Józef Filipowicz (1933–2006) – pilot
- Michał Filipowicz (1914–1978) – RAF aviator, son of Wanda Krahelska
- Zbigniew Filipowicz (1917–1944) – participant of the Warsaw Rising
- Marian Gadzalski (1934–1985) – visual artist, photographer
- Jan Gaj (1943–2011) – physicist, prof. Faculty of Physics, University of Warsaw
- Zdzisław Benedykt Gałecki (1946–2009) – visual artist
- Bohdan Grzymała–Siedlecki (1919–1999) – writer, journalist, tourist guide
- Anna Halcewicz (1947–1988) – actress
- Maria Horbowa (1916–2007) – author of a book about the Great Famine in the Ukrainian which she herself experienced
- Adam Iwiński (1958–2010) – film director, actor
- Józef Jaworski (1923–2012) – doctor of technical sciences, lecturer at Warsaw University of Technology
- Kazimierz Jeczeń (1940–2001) – director, journalist
- Marek Keller (1955–2012) – ornithologist, naturalist, lecturer at the Warsaw University of Life Sciences
- Tadeusz Kiciński (1929–1988) – meliorant, professor at the Warsaw University of Life Sciences
- Zenon Kierul (1929–1986) – professor at the Warsaw University of Life Sciences
- Andrzej Klawe (1938–1991) – prof. of the Warsaw University of Technology
- Józef Kochman (1903–1995) – phytopathologist, mycologist, professor at the Warsaw University of Life Sciences, member of Polish Academy of Sciences
- Janusz Kondratowicz (1940–2014) – poet, satirist, songwriter
- Jan Karol Kostrzewski (1915–2005) – epidemiologist, former minister of health and social welfare, former president of the Polish Academy of Sciences
- Krystyna Krahelska (1914–1944) – poet, girl scout
- Wanda Krahelska (1886–1968) – a socialist activist
- Wojciech Kubiak (1841–1899) – parson of the parish of St. Catherine (1875–1899), dean the Higher Metropolitan Seminary in Warsaw
- Bogusław Kubicki (1933–1985) – geneticist, professor at the Warsaw University of Life Sciences
- Jan Kuczkowski (1773–1865) – for 55 years parson of the parish of St. Catherine
- Józef Kuczyński (1913–1977) – docent at the Warsaw University of Life Sciences
- Zenona Kudanowicz (1893–1988) – actress
- Józef Kukułka (1929–2004) – professor at the UW, husband of Krystyna Bolesta–Kukułka
- Tomasz Leoniuk (1963–2002) – diplomat
- Grażyna Lipińska (1902–1995) – a soldier, participant in the Battle of Warsaw, the 3rd Silesian Rising and the Warsaw Rising
- Włodzimierz Ławniczak (1959–2011) – journalist, in 2010 acting as the president TVP S.A.
- Jerzy Machaj (1941–1997) – sports and local government activist, president of KS Polonia Warszawa
- Franciszek Maciak (1927–2002) – professor at the Warsaw University of Life Sciences
- Maciej E. Maciejewski (1932–2002) – sculptor
- Jan Maj (1936–2012) – sports activist, president of the Polish Football Association
- Longin Majdecki (1925–1997) – creator of the "History of Gardens"
- Elżbieta Malicka (1938–2009) – veterinarian, anatomopathologist, professor at the Faculty of Veterinary Medicine at the Warsaw University of Life Sciences; wife of Konrad Malicki
- Konrad Malicki (1929 – 2011) – veterinarian, virologist, professor at the Faculty of Veterinary Medicine at the Warsaw University of Life Sciences; husband of Elżbieta Malicka
- Jan Malinowski (1922–1994) – geologist
- Florian Maniecki (1927–2008) – agricultural economist, professor at the Warsaw University of Life Sciences
- Ryszard Manteuffel (1903–1991) – agricultural economist, professor at the Warsaw University of Life Sciences, member of the Polish Academy of Sciences
- Władysław Martyka (1915–1944) – insurgent of the Warsaw Uprising, in which he died
- Tadeusz Miciak (1915–2000) – activist of the Peasant movement and member of the Bataliony Chłopskie or Peasants' Battalions
- Antoni Mikołajczyk (1939–2000) – professor, visual artist
- Kazimierz Modzelewski (1934–2011) – artisan, entrepreneur, politician, Member of Parliament
- 1998–2018: Janusz Nasfeter (1920–1998) – film director and screenwriter; in 2018 his remains were moved to the Powązki Cemetery in 2018
- Mieczysław Nasiłowski (1929–2004) – economist, professor SGH
- Wojciech Natanson (1904–1996) – writer, translator
- Jerzy Ostromęcki (1909–1988) – meliorant, professor at the Warsaw University of Life Sciences
- Tadeusz Pajda (1927–1997) – journalist
- Zygmunt Pancewicz (1923–2008) – prof. Of the Warsaw University of Technology
- Jan Pęczek (1950–2021) – actor
- Henryk Pecherski (1908–1986) – pedagogue, prof. UW
- Andrzej Piszczatowski (1945–2011) – actor
- Teresa Plata–Nowińska (1946–2009) – professor at the Academy of Fine Arts in Warsaw
- Leopold Podbielski (1815–1875) – for 24 years vicar, and afterwards parson of the St. Catherine Parish
- Józefat Poznański (1834–1924) – pomologist, veteran January Uprising
- Regina Poźniak (1930–1985) – meliorant, professor at the Warsaw University of Life Sciences
- Henryk Pruchniewicz (1926–2006) – economist, former minister of the chemical industry
- Jan Przeździecki (1889–1951) – participant in the Polish–Bolshevik war, Home Army officer
- Zdzisław Przeździecki (1924–2012) – veterinarian, professor at the Warsaw University of Life Sciences, a soldier of the Home Army
- Wojciech Puzio (1928–1968) – athlete
- Janusz Rapnicki (1926–1969) – visual artist
- Edward Romanowski (1944–2007) – athlete
- Witold Rosa (1929–1985) – forester, docent at the Warsaw University of Life Sciences
- Kazimierz Siarkiewicz (1927–2001) – lawyer, professor
- Anna Skarbek–Sokołowska (1878–1972) – a writer
- Piotr Sobczyk (1887–1979) – an engineer–farmer, member of the Sejm of the 3rd, 4th and 5th term in the 2nd Polish Republic
- Jan Stępień (1895–1976) – painter
- Zdzisław Stępniak (1929–2005) – journalist
- Piotr Strebeyko (1908–2003) – biologist, professor of the University of Warsaw
- Abdon Stryszak (1908–1995) – veterinarian, professor of the University of Warsaw and the Warsaw University of Life Sciences
- Andrzej Szuster (1931–2008) – doctor of technical sciences, lecturer at the Warsaw University of Technology
- Piotr Szweda (1933–2008) – general
- Janina Szweycer–Grupińska (1914–1994) – social activist, initiator of the creation of the Polish branch of the Prison Brotherhood providing evangelical help to prisoners
- Jerzy Świątkiewicz (1925–2011) – lawyer, vice-chairman Supreme Administrative Court of Poland in 1998–95, deputy Ombudsman in 1995–2006
- Teodor Tazbir (1921–1987) – philosopher
- Jan Ferdynand Tkaczyk (1925–2008) – music teacher, conductor
- Andrzej Tomaszewski (1934–2010) – professor of the Warsaw University of Technology, architect, town planner, architectural historian, medievalist, specialist in the field of monument protection
- Ludwik Watycha (1909–1976) – habilitated doctor geologist, Tatra Mountains and Podhale region researcher
- Jerzy Wielbut (1936–1990) – artist, musician, violin maker
- Jerzy Więckowski (1921–1988) – professor, dean of the Faculty of Management of the University of Warsaw
- Bolesław Winiarski (1924–2000) – professor at the Warsaw University of Life Sciences
- Zbigniew Wnuk (1948–2009) – architect, Ph.D., researcher at the Warsaw University of Technology
- Andrzej Wyspiański (1955–1997) – painter, professor at the European Academy of Arts; possibly related to Polish painter, playwright and poet Stanisław Wyspiański
- Bolesław Zagała (1912–1995) – translator, author of stories for children and adolescents, editor–in–chief of Świerszczyk; decorated with the Order of the Smile; he was the husband of Janina Zagałowa
- Janina Zagała (1913–2001) – art historian, guide; she was he wife of Bolesław Zagała
- Edmund Zieliński (1909–1992) – hockey player, Olympian from Garmisch–Partenkirchen.
- Sylwester Zieliński (1963–2000) – cinematographer
- Mikołaj Zozula (1915–1985) – journalist and peasant activist
