= Lorna Stewart =

Canadian graph theorist

Lorna Kay Stewart is a retired Canadian computer scientist and discrete mathematician whose research concerns algorithms in graph theory and special classes of graphs, including cographs, permutation graphs, interval graphs, comparability graphs and their complements, well-covered graphs, and asteroidal triple-free graphs. She earned her Ph.D. in 1985 at the University of Toronto under the supervision of Derek Corneil, and is a professor emerita at the University of Alberta.

== Selected publications ==
- Corneil, D. G.; Perl, Y.; Stewart, L. K. (1985), "A linear recognition algorithm for cographs", SIAM Journal on Computing, 14 (4): 926–934, doi:10.1137/0214065, MR 0807891, Zbl 0575.68065
- Spinrad, Jeremy; Brandstädt, Andreas; Stewart, Lorna (1987), "Bipartite permutation graphs", Discrete Applied Mathematics, 18 (3): 279–292, doi:10.1016/0166-218X(87)90064-3, MR 0917130, Zbl 0628.05055
- Sankaranarayana, Ramesh S.; Stewart, Lorna K. (1992), "Complexity results for well-covered graphs", Networks, 22 (3): 247–262, doi:10.1002/net.3230220304, MR 1161178, Zbl 0780.90104
- Kratsch, Dieter; Stewart, Lorna (1993), "Domination on cocomparability graphs", SIAM Journal on Discrete Mathematics, 6 (3): 400–417, doi:10.1137/0406032, MR 1229694, Zbl 0780.05032
- Corneil, Derek G.; Olariu, Stephan; Stewart, Lorna (1997), "Asteroidal triple-free graphs", SIAM Journal on Discrete Mathematics, 10 (3): 399–430, doi:10.1137/S0895480193250125, MR 1459947, Zbl 0884.05075
- Corneil, Derek G.; Olariu, Stephan; Stewart, Lorna (October 2009), "The LBFS structure and recognition of interval graphs", SIAM Journal on Discrete Mathematics, 23 (4): 1905–1953, doi:10.1137/S0895480100373455, MR 2594964, Zbl 1207.05131
