= François Lalonde =

Canadian mathematician

- Born: 1955 (age 70–71)
- Education: Université de Montréal (BSc, MSc); Université de Paris-Sud (PhD)
- Scientific career
- Fields: Symplectic geometry Topology
- Workplaces: Université du Québec à Montréal
- Thesis: Homologies non-singulières d'une variété et homologie sectionnelle d'une submersion (1985)
- Doctoral advisor: Weishu Shih
- Notable students: Tadashi Tokieda

François Lalonde (born 17 September 1955) is a Canadian mathematician specializing in symplectic geometry and topology.

== Education ==
Lalonde received a bachelor's degree in physics from the Université de Montréal in 1976 at the age of 20, and completed a propaedeutics in mathematics the following year. In 1979, he obtained a master's degree in logic and theoretical computer science, with a focus on computational complexity theory and NP-completeness, from the same institution. He earned his doctorate in mathematics with habilitation (doctorat d'Etat) in 1985 from Paris-Saclay University, Orsay, and subsequently held an NSERC university research fellowship at the Université du Québec à Montréal.

== Teaching ==
From 1991 to 2000 Lalonde was a full professor at the Université du Québec à Montréal. He then joined the Université de Montréal, where he held the Canada Research Chair in differential geometry and topology from 2001 to 2022. Since 2023, he is adjunct professor at Université du Québec à Montréal. He has also held positions at the Institut des Hautes Études Scientifiques (1983-85), Harvard University (1989-1990), and invited positions at Université de Strasbourg (1990), Tel Aviv University (1997-1999), the École Polytechnique (2001-2002), the Fields Institute at University of Toronto (2001) where he was chair of the scientific committee of the six-month thematic program in Symplectic topology, Stanford University (2005 and 2022) where he was twice the holder of the Stanford Distinguished Lectures Series, the École Normale Supérieure de Lyon (2008), and Aix-Marseille University (2015) where he was the holder of the Jean-Morlet chair at the Centre International de rencontres mathématiques of the Société mathématique de France.

== Research ==
Lalonde became a Fellow of the Royal Society of Canada in 1997 at the early age of 41, and a Fellow of the Fields Institute in 2001, in the first cohort of inductees. From 2000 to 2002 he was a Killam Research Fellow.

From 2004 to 2008 and from 2011 to 2013 he was the director of the Centre de Recherches Mathématiques (CRM), based at the Université de Montréal. The CRM is considered the premier scientific institute in Canada: members of the institution have won the Turing Prize and the Wolf Prize, the highest awards in their fields. In 2022, James Maynard, now a fellow of St John's College, Oxford, was awarded the Fields Medal after his postdoctoral year in the CRM-ISM postdoctoral program that Lalonde founded. In 2006, Lalonde was an invited speaker at the International Congress of Mathematicians, speaking on Lagrangian submanifolds.

Lalonde (co)founded several institutions:

- The Institut des Sciences Mathématiques (Institute of Mathematical Sciences), based at UQAM, a training and research consortium of all eight universities in Québec with a doctoral program in mathematics, with Francis Clarke, in 1991. This was the first large institute of mathematics, worldwide, with 250 professors and a thousand of graduate students and postdoctoral fellows.
- The Centre interuniversitaire de recherches en géométrie différentielle et en topologie (Interuniversity centre for research on differential geometry and topology) at UQAM, in 1985.
- The Institut transdisciplinaire de recherches en informatique quantique (Transdisciplinary institute for research on quantum information), at Université de Montréal, studying quantum mechanics and quantum information, with Gilles Brassard and Michael Hilke, in 2006.
- The journal Annales mathématiques du Québec (Mathematical annals of Quebec), with Christian Genest and Claude Levesque, in 2013.
- The CNRS-CRM International laboratory in 2006, a joint venture that supports relations between French and Canadian researchers.

== Publications ==
=== Journals ===
- Lalonde, F., & McDuff, D. (1995), "The geometry of symplectic energy", Annals of Mathematics, 141: 349–371, arXiv:Math.SG/9306216
- Lalonde, F., & McDuff, D. (1995), "Hofer's $L^{\infty}$-geometry: energy and stability of Hamiltonian flows", Inventiones Mathematicae, 122: 1––69, arXiv:Math.SG/9503227
- Lalonde, F., & McDuff, D. (1995), "Local Non-Squeezing Theorems and Stability", Geometric and Functional Analalysis, 5: 364, doi:10.1007/978-3-0348-9102-8_8
- Lalonde, F., & Polterovich, L. (1997), "Symplectic diffeomorphisms as isometries of Hofer's norm", Topology, 36: 711–728, doi:10.1016/S0040-9383(96)00024-9
- Lalonde, F., & Pinsonnault, M. (2004), "The topology of the space of symplectic balls in rational $4$-manifolds", Duke Mathematical Journal, 122: 347–397, arXiv:Math.SG/0207096
- Lalonde, F., & Hu, S. (2010), "'A relative Seidel morphism and the Albers map", Transactions of the American Mathematical Society, 362: 1135–1168, doi:10.1090/S0002-9947-09-04986-1

=== Books ===
- Lalonde, F., & McDuff, D., "J-holomorphic curves and the classification of rational and ruled symplectic 4-manifolds" in Thomas, C. B. (ed), Symplectic and Contact Geometry (1996, Cambridge University Press; ISBN 978-0521570862)
- Hurtubise, J., & Lalonde, F. (eds), Gauge Theory and Symplectic Geometry (1997, Kluwer Academic Publishers; ISBN 978-9048148301)
- Lalonde, F. (ed), Proceedings of the CRM Workshop on Geometry, Topology and Dynamics (1998, American Mathematical Society; ISBN 978-0821808771)
- Biran, P., Cornea, O., & Lalonde, F. (eds), Morse Theoretical Methods in Symplectic Topology and Non-Linear Analysis (2005, Kluwer Academic Publishers; ISBN 978-1402042669)
- Abreu, M., Lalonde, F., & Polterovich, L. (eds), New Perspectives and Challenges in Symplectic Field Theory (2009, American Mathematical Society; ISBN 978-0821843567)
