= Janusz Łęski =

Polish film director and screenwriter (1930–2022)

Janusz Łęski (12 February 1930 – 1 January 2022) was a Polish film director and screenwriter.

He was born in Radomsko, Poland. He became famous for creating popular films and series for children and youth. He died on 1 January 2022, at the age of 91.

== Filmography ==
- Miasteczko (1958; director with Julian Dziedzina and Romuald Drobaczyński)
- Na przełaj (1971)
- Sobie król (1973)
- Rodzina Leśniewskich (1978; TV series)
- Kłusownik (1980; serial TV)
- Rodzina Leśniewskich (1980; film version)
- Na tropach Bartka (1982)
- Przygrywka (1982; TV series)
- Urwisy z Doliny Młynów (1985; TV series)
- Klementynka i Klemens - gęsi z Doliny Młynów (1986; TV series)
- Janna (1989; TV series; director with Adam Iwiński)
- Janka (1990; film version)
