= Adam Iwiński =

Polish film director (1958–2010)

Adam Iwiński (1958 – 4 December 2010, Warsaw, Poland) was a Polish film director, cinematographer, and actor.

== Career ==
Iwiński began his cinematography career in the mid-1980s and was the assistant director and second director, among others, on films such as: Jezioro Bodenskie, Pułkownik Kwiatkowski, Hero of the Year and A Chronicle of Amorous Accidents. After 2000, he teamed up with production company MTL Maxfilm, for which he worked on the films Just Love Me and Zróbmy sobie wnuka. He was also a co-founder of the soap opera M jak miłość, and directed more than 30 episodes.

== Death ==
Iwiński died suddenly in Warsaw on 4 December and was buried at the Służew Old Cemetery in Warsaw on 17 December.

== Filmography ==
- 1984: Zabawa w chowanego - współpraca reżyserska
- 1985: Jezioro Bodeńskie - współpraca reżyserska
- 1985: Kronika wypadków miłosnych - współpraca reżyserska
- 1986: Bohater roku - współpraca reżyserska
- 1986: Nieproszony gość - współpraca reżyserska
- 1989: Janka - reżyseria (odc. 7–9), II reżyser
- 1990: Janka - II reżyser
- 1991: V.I.P. - II reżyser
- 1991: Les enfants de la guerre - asystent reżysera
- 1992: Szwadron - współpraca reżyserska
- 1993: Czterdziestolatek. 20 lat później - reżyseria (odc. 12), II reżyser
- 1993: Wow - II reżyser
- 1995: Pułkownik Kwiatkowski - II reżyser
- 1995: Sukces - obsada aktorska (odc. 1), II reżyser
- 1997: Musisz żyć - II reżyser
- 1997: Sława i chwała - II reżyser
- 1997: Szczęśliwego Nowego Jorku - II reżyser
- 1998: Gosia i Małgosia - współpraca reżyserska
- 1999: Tygrysy Europy - obsada aktorska, II reżyser
- 2000-2010: M jak miłość - reżyseria, II reżyser, obsada aktorska (odc. 65, 78, 348, 487)
- 2000: Przeprowadzki - II reżyser
- 2000: Twarze i maski - obsada aktorska (odc. 6)
- 2001: Garderoba damska - reżyseria (odc. 5)
- 2001: Gulczas, a jak myślisz... - współpraca reżyserska
- 2001: Myszka Walewska - reżyseria
- 2001: Przeprowadzki - kierowca ciężarówki
- 2003: Tygrysy Europy 2
- 2003: Zróbmy sobie wnuka - II reżyser
- 2006: Tylko mnie kochaj - II reżyser
