= Anna Lawniczak =

Applied mathematician

Anna T. Lawniczak (born 1953) is an applied mathematician known for her work on complex systems including lattice gas automata, a type of cellular automaton used to model fluid dynamics. Educated in Poland and the US, she has worked in the US and Canada, where she is a professor at the University of Guelph. She is the former president of the Canadian Applied and Industrial Mathematics Society.

== Education and career ==
After earning a master's degree in engineering (summa cum laude) from the Wrocław University of Science and Technology in Poland, Lawniczak went to Southern Illinois University in the US for doctoral study in mathematics. She completed her Ph.D. in 1981, supervised by Philip J. Feinsilver.

Before taking her current position at the University of Guelph in 1989, Lawniczak was a professor at Louisiana State University in the US, and the University of Toronto in Canada.

She was president of the Canadian Applied and Industrial Mathematics Society / Société Canadienne de Mathématiques Appliquées et Industrielles (CAIMS/SCMAI) from 1997 to 2001. As president she guided a 1998 transition that included a new constitution, formal incorporation, a new annual conference, and a change from its former name, the Canadian Applied Mathematics Society / Société Canadienne de Mathématiques Appliquées.

== Recognition ==
The Canadian Applied and Industrial Mathematics Society gave Lawniczak their Arthur Beaumont Distinguished Service Award in 2003. In the same year, the Fields Institute listed her as a Fellow in recognition of her "outstanding contributions to the Fields Institute and its activities".

The Engineering Institute of Canada named her as an EIC Fellow in 2018, after a nomination from IEEE Canada, naming her as "an international authority in the discrete modeling & simulation methods like Individually Based Simulation Models, Agent Based Simulations, Cellular Automata and Lattice Gas Cellular Automata, a field of which she is one of the co-developers".
