= Janna (TV series) =

German-Polish children's television series

- Polish: Janka
- Written by: Janusz Łęski
- Screenplay by: Janusz Łęski
- Directed by: Janusz Łęski; Adam Iwiński
- Starring: Agnieszka Krukówna
- Composers: Krzesimir Dębski; Andrzej Korzyński
- Country of origin: Poland; West Germany
- Original languages: Polish; German
- No. of seasons: 1
- No. of episodes: 15

Production
- Cinematography: Jacek Prosinski
- Editor: Miroslawa Garlicka
- Running time: 29 minutes
- Production companies: Telewizja Polska; Westdeutscher Rundfunk

Original release
- Release: 24 September 1989

Related
- Janka (1990 TV film)

Janna (Polish: Janka) is a 1989 German-Polish children's television series. Set in the 1920s in a Polish village, the story recounts the adventures of Janna, the daughter of an innkeeper. In 1990, the concept was spun off into a television movie of the same name.

== Synopsis ==
The series is set in a Polish village in the 1920s and is about the adventures of the innkeeper's daughter Janna and two gangs of children, the "Wolves" and the "Eagles". After a duel between the gangs, Janna receives a ring from her dying aunt, who tells her that it has magical powers. The competition between the children's gangs is also reflected in the conflict between the adults: the conservative grandfather Nowak and the progressive Jakob Bromski, who introduces airplanes and electricity to the town, repeatedly clash. Janna's mother has a difficult relationship with her father and, against his will, is very fond of Jakob.

== Cast and characters ==
Polish version

- Agnieszka Krukówna as Janka Nowak
- Tadeusz Horvath as Julek Bromski
- Krzysztof Kowalewski as Oskar Nowak
- Joanna Żółkowska as Mother Marta
- Grzegorz Wons as Jakub Bromski
- Zofia Merle as servant Adela

German version

- Eva Michaelis as Janna Nowak
- Jan-David Rönfeldt as Julek Bromski
- Franz Josef Steffens as Oskar Nowak
- Monika Gabriel as Mother Marta
- Christian Brückner as Jakub Bromski
- Ursula Vogel as servant Adela
