= Kenneth Davidson (mathematician) =

Canadian mathematician

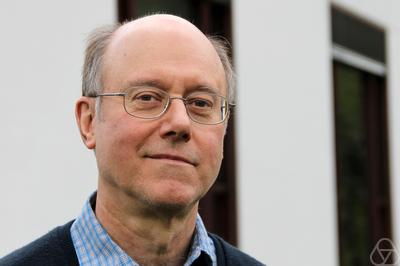
Kenneth Davidson

Kenneth Ralph Davidson (born 1951 in Edmonton, Alberta) is Professor of Pure Mathematics at the University of Waterloo. He did his undergraduate work at Waterloo and received his Ph.D. under the supervision of William Arveson at the University of California, Berkeley in 1976. Davidson was Director of the Fields Institute from 2001 to 2004. His areas of research include operator theory and C*-algebras. Since 2007 he has been appointed University Professor at the University of Waterloo.

He is a Fellow of the Royal Society of Canada. He was appointed Fellow of the Fields Institute in 2006. In 2018 the Canadian Mathematical Society listed him in their inaugural class of fellows.

== Publications ==
- Real Analysis and Applications, with Allan Donsig, Undergraduate Texts in Mathematics, Springer, 2009.
- $C^\ast$-Algebras by Example, Fields Institute Monograph 6, AMS, 1996.
- Nest Algebras, Pitman Research Notes in Math. 191, Longman, 1988.

== See also ==
- List of University of Waterloo people
