= Messoud Efendiev =

Azerbaijani academic

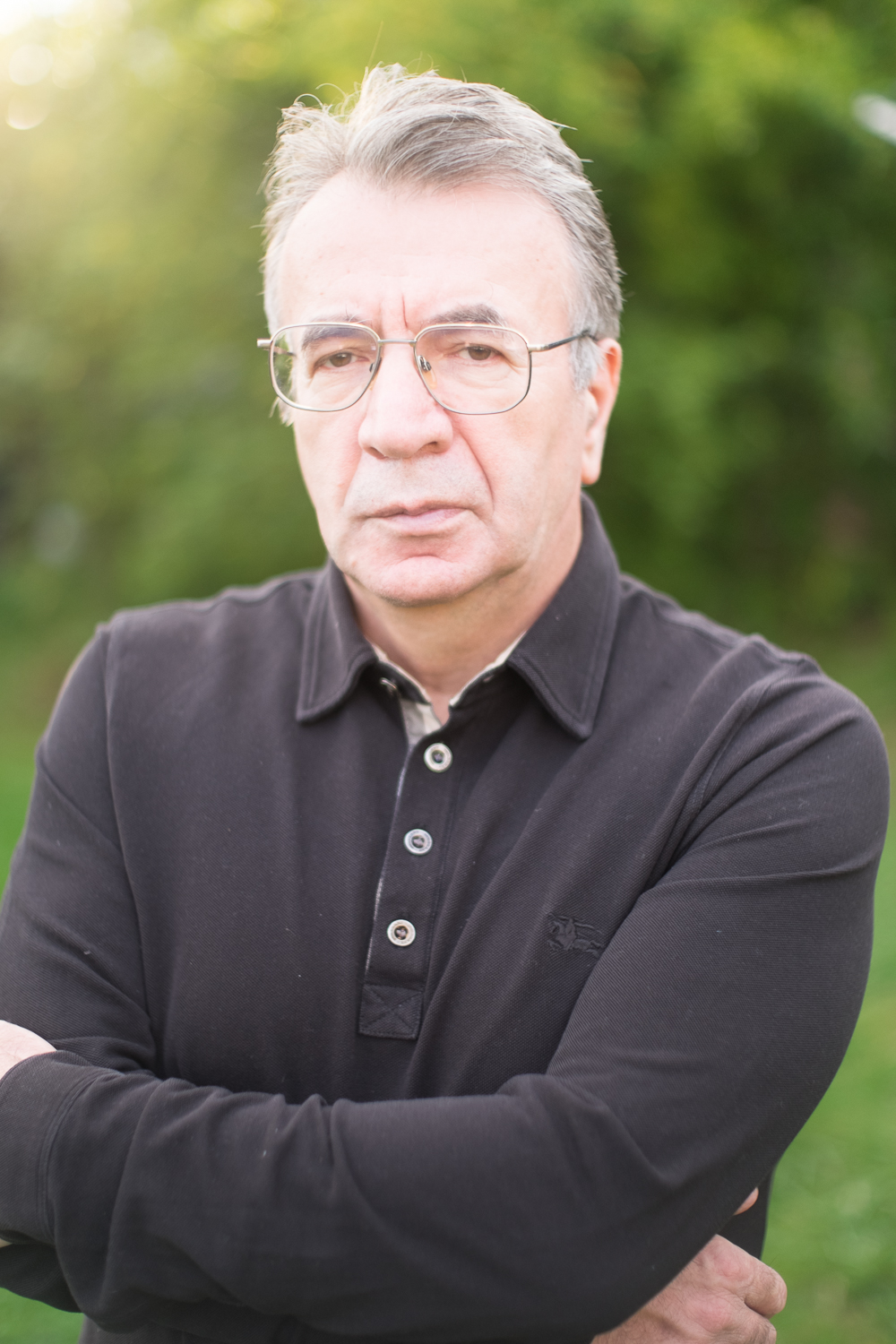
- Born: 21 October 1953; Zaqatala, Azerbaijan SSR, USSR
- Citizenship: Azerbaijan SSR (1953–1993); Azerbaijan (1993–)
- Awards: Alexander von Humboldt Foundation fellowship (Germany) – 1991; Japan Society for the Promotion of Science – 2006; Otto Monsted Foundation fellowship (Denmark) – 2009; Feodor Lynen Research Fellowship for Experienced Researchers – 2015; Deans Distinguished Visiting Professor in the University of Toronto and in the Fields Institute-2018; James D. Murray Distinguished Visiting Professor in the University of Waterloo-2019/2020
- Scientific career
- Fields: Mathematics
- Workplaces: Azerbaijan National Academy of Sciences; University of Stuttgart; Free University Berlin; Technical University of Munich; Helmholtz Zentrum München
- Website: Personal Website

Messoud Efendiev (Azerbaijani: Məsud Əfəndiyev) (21 October 1953) is an Azerbaijani scientist. He was born in Zaqatala, Azerbaijan.

== Career ==
His distinguished thesis work was written in 1974/75 in the Moscow State University under supervision of Professors Mark Vishik and Alexander Shnirelman on topological methods in nonlinear analysis. His PhD thesis was written at Moscow State University from 1975/76–1978/79 on a global solvability of nonlinear Riemann–Hilbert problems which was defended in 1980. His habilitation thesis was titled "Geometrical properties of nonlinear mapping related to pseudodifferential operators and their topological degree" and was defended in 1998 in the Free University Berlin.

He worked from 1991 to 1994 in the University of Stuttgart, from 1994 to 1999 in Free University Berlin and from 2000 to 2005 as a Geschäftsführer of SFB project “Multifield Problems.” From 2005 to 2007 he worked as a visiting professor in Technical University of Munich and from 2007 to 2013 he was head of the Department of Dynamical Systems in the Institute of Biomathematics and Biometry at the Helmholtz Center Munich. He is currently working as one of the leading scientists in Helmholtz Zentrum München (Institute of Computational Biology).

He is Editor in Chief of the International Journal of Biomathematics and Biostatistics, as well as a member of Editorial Boards of many leading international Journals, in particular, such as Mathematical Methods in the Applied Sciences, Glasgow Journal of Mathematics, Journal of Nonautonomous and Stochastic Dynamical Systems, Advances in Mathematical Sciences and Applications, Journal of Coupled Systems and Multiscale Dynamics, American Institute of Mathematical Sciences (AIMS) – book series Differential Equations and Dynamical Systems etc.

He has made many important contributions in nonlinear analysis, topological invariants, and global solvability of nonlinear boundary value problems related to pseudodifferential operators, in particular, on global solvability of classical nonlinear Riemann–Hilbert problems. His current research interests include infinite-dimensional dynamical systems and dimension as well as asymptotics of Kolmogorov entropy of their attractors, mathematical modeling of life science problems, especially in medicine, biology, and ecology, and their long-time dynamics. For these latter topics, he obtained JSPS as well as the Otto Monsted Fellowship. In all areas mentioned above, he has obtained significant results, which are reflected in his invitations to many international conferences as a keynote speaker. He has published more than 160 journal and conference papers and 7 advanced monographs published by leading publishers, Springer, Birkhäuser, American Mathematical Society (series of Mathematical Surveys and Monographs), Gakkotoscho-Japan, and American Institute of Mathematical Sciences. He has collaborated with many distinguished mathematicians in many countries. He was awarded the Feodor Lynen Research Fellowship for Experienced Researchers by the Alexander von Humboldt Foundation. In 2018, he became a Dean's Distinguished Visiting Professor at the University of Toronto and in the Fields Institute. In 2019 he received the James D.Murray is a distinguished visiting professor at the University of Waterloo. It is worth noting that, in the USA and Canada such prestigious titles and positions are, as a rule, awarded to nominated Nobel Laureates and Fields Medalists.

== Sources ==
- Helmholtz Zentrum München – German Research Center for Environmental Health Nonlinear Phenomena in Biology, Physics and Mechanics
