= Jan Pęczek =

Polish actor (1950–2021)

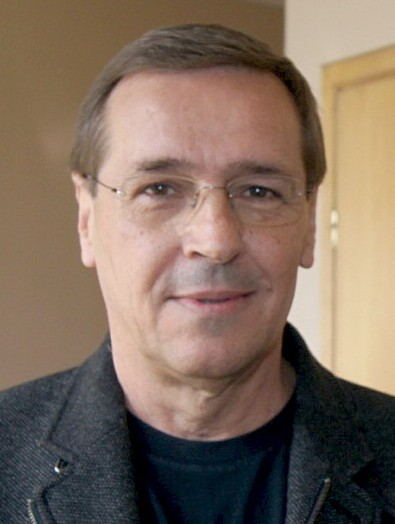
- Pęczek in 2012
- Born: 21 August 1950; Maków Podhalański, Poland
- Died: 27 July 2021 (aged 70); Warsaw, Poland
- Resting place: Służew Old Cemetery
- Occupation: Actor
- Years active: 1974–2021
- Spouse: Jadwiga Bargiełowska-Pęczek

Jan Pęczek (21 August 1950 – 27 July 2021) was a Polish actor, known for the role of Zenon Grzelak in the TVP2 series Barwy szczęścia.

== Career ==
In 1974, Jan Pęczek graduated from the Acting Department of the AST National Academy of Theatre Arts. Throughout his career, he was associated with several theatrical institutions, including the Pomeranian Region Theater in Grudziądz, the Stefan Jaracz Theater in Olsztyn, the Silesian Theatre in Katowice, and the Popular Theater in Warsaw. From 1982 until his death in 2021, Pęczek served as an actor at the Współczesny Theater in Warsaw.

== Personal life ==
Jan Pęczek was married to Jadwiga Bargiełowska-Pęczek, who died two months prior to his death. Together, they had three children and seven grandchildren.

== Death ==
Jan Pęczek died on 27 July 2021 due to bone marrow cancer at the age of 70, in Warsaw. A funeral Mass was held on 13 August 2021 at the Church of St. Catherine. He was interred on the same day at the Służew Old Cemetery.
