= John Charles Fields =

Canadian mathematician (1863–1932)

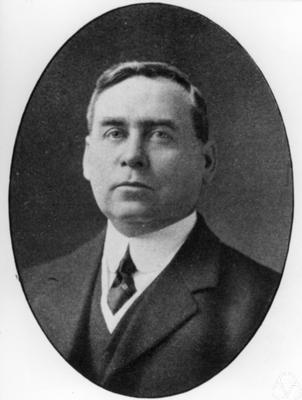
- John Charles Fields
- Born: May 14, 1863; Hamilton, Canada West
- Died: August 9, 1932 (aged 69); Toronto, Ontario, Canada
- Resting place: Hamilton Cemetery
- Education: University of Toronto; Johns Hopkins University
- Known for: Fields Medal, Fields Institute
- Scientific career
- Fields: Mathematics
- Thesis: Symbolic Finite Solutions and Solutions by Definite Integrals of the Equation d^{n}y/dx^{n} = x^{m}y (1886)
- Doctoral students: Samuel Beatty

John Charles Fields, FRS, FRSC (May 14, 1863 – August 9, 1932) was a Canadian mathematician and the founder of the Fields Medal for outstanding achievement in mathematics.

== Career ==
Born in Hamilton, Canada West, to a leather shop owner, Fields graduated from Hamilton Collegiate Institute in 1880 and University College, University of Toronto in 1884 before leaving for the United States to study at Johns Hopkins University in Baltimore, Maryland. Fields received his Ph.D. in 1887. His thesis, entitled Symbolic Finite Solutions and Solutions by Definite Integrals of the Equation d^{n}y/dx^{n} = x^{m}y, was published in the American Journal of Mathematics in 1886.

Fields taught for two years at Johns Hopkins before joining the faculty of Allegheny College in Meadville, Pennsylvania. Disillusioned with the state of mathematical research in North America at the time, he left for Europe in 1891, locating primarily in Berlin, Göttingen and Paris, where he associated with some of the greatest mathematical minds of the time, including Karl Weierstrass, Felix Klein, Ferdinand Georg Frobenius and Max Planck. Fields also began a lifelong friendship with Gösta Mittag-Leffler. He began publishing papers on a new topic, algebraic functions, which would prove to be the most fruitful research field of his career.

Fields returned to Canada in 1902 to lecture at the University of Toronto. Back in the country of his birth, he worked tirelessly to raise the status of mathematics within academic and public circles. He successfully lobbied the Ontario Legislature for an annual research grant of $75,000 for the university and helped establish the National Research Council of Canada, and the Ontario Research Foundation. Fields served as president of the Royal Canadian Institute from 1919 until 1925, during which time he aspired to mold the institute into a leading centre of scientific research, although with mixed success. His efforts, however, were pivotal in making Toronto the location of the 1924 International Congress of Mathematicians (ICM). He was an Invited Speaker of the ICM in 1912 at Cambridge, in 1924 at Toronto, and in 1928 at Bologna.

Fields is best known for his development of the Fields Medal, which is considered by some to be the Nobel Prize of mathematics, although there are differences between the awards. First awarded in 1936, the medal was reintroduced in 1950 and has been awarded every four years since. It is awarded to two, three or four mathematicians under the age of 40 who have made important contributions to the field.

Fields began planning the award in the late 1920s but, due to deteriorating health, never saw the implementation of the medal in his lifetime. He died on August 9, 1932, after a three-month illness; in his will, he left $47,000 for the Fields Medal fund. His plan for the Fields medal was completed by J. L. Synge.

== Honours ==
Fields was elected a fellow of the Royal Society of Canada in 1907 and of the Royal Society of London in 1913.

The Fields Institute at the University of Toronto was named in his honour.
