= Joanna Żółkowska =

Polish actress (born 1950)

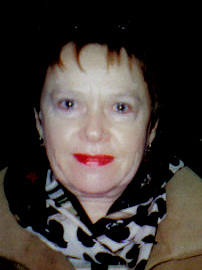
Joanna Żółkowska

Joanna Żółkowska (born 6 March 1950 in Warsaw) is a Polish actress.

== Filmography ==
- Siedemset siedemdziesiąt siedem, 1972
- Szklana kula, 1972
- Illuminacja (Illumination), 1972
- Obszar zamknięty, 1973
- Strach, 1975
- Smuga cienia (The Shadow Line), 1976
- Barwy ochronne (Camouflage), 1977
- Lalka (series), 1978
- Najdłuższa wojna nowoczesnej Europy (series), 1979–1981
- Prom do Szwecji, 1979
- Golem, 1979
- 07 zgłoś się (season 3 episode 1: Grobowiec rodziny von Rausch), 1981
- W wannie, 1981
- Wojna światów - Następne stulecie, 1981
- Papkin - sztuka aktorska, 1982
- Popielec, 1982
- Cesarskie cięcie (Caesarean Section), 1987
- Wielkie oczy, 1987
- Kawalerki, 1989
- Sceny nocne, 1989
- Janka, 1989
- Superwizja, 1990
- Rozmowy kontrolowane (Controlled Conversations), 1991
- Balanga, 1993
- Spółka rodzinna (series), 1994
- Młode wilki, 1995
- Kamień na kamieniu, 1995
- Dom, 1995
- Matka swojej matki, 1996
- Ja, Malinowski, 1999
- Na koniec świata, 1999
- Dom (2 episodes, season 5 episode 2: Miłość to tylko obietnica and season 5 episode 3: Kolejka do życia), 2000
- Temida jest kobietą, czyli historie zapożyczone od Guy de Maupassanta, 2000
- Klan (series), 1997-
- Zróbmy sobie wnuka, 2003
- Długi weekend, 2004
- The Office PL, 2021

=== Screenplays ===
- Matka swojej matki, 1996
- Na koniec świata, 1999

== Relationships ==
She has a sister and a daughter who are both actresses. Her former husband was a director and actor. She is married to Robert Gliński, a director and scenarist.
