= Jianhong Wu =

Canadian mathematician

- Born: 1964 (age 61–62)
- Citizenship: Canadian
- Education: University of Alberta
- Known for: Contributions to mathematical epidemiology, nonlinear dynamics, and delay differential equations.
- Scientific career
- Fields: Applied mathematics, mathematical epidemiology
- Workplaces: York University

Jianhong Wu (吴建宏; born in 1964) is a Canadian applied mathematician and the founding director of the Laboratory for Industrial and Applied Mathematics at York University. He is the inaugural Director of Y-EMERGE , and in 2025, he became the inaugural Director of the Centre of Excellence in Artificial Intelligence for Public Health Advancement (AIPHA).

== Education ==
Wu received his PhD degree in 1987 at age 23. He was the first G. Kaplan Award Postdoctoral Fellow at University of Alberta during 1988–90, and joined York University in 1990.

== Career ==
He holds the life-time title of University Distinguished Research Professor, and was awarded a senior Canada Research Chair in Industrial and Applied Mathematics at York University between 2001-2022. He was awarded the Senior York Research Chair in Industrial and Applied Mathematics in 2022. He was also awarded the NSERC/Sanofi Industrial Research Chair in Vaccine Mathematics, Modelling and Manufacturing in 2017-2022.

In 2008, Dr. Wu founded the Centre for Disease Modelling, and in 2016, he became the founding scientific director of The Disaster, Emergency and Rapid Response Simulation initiative (ADERSIM).

He is an editor-in-chief of the journal Infectious Disease Modelling.

== Awards and recognition ==
He was awarded by the Alexander von Humboldt Foundation an Alexander van Humboldt Fellow at Justus-Liebig-Universitat Giessen, a Paul Erdos Visiting Professor at the Bolyai Institute, a FAPESP Visiting Research Fellow at Universidade de Sao Paulo. He is a Fellow of the Fields Institute, a Fellow of the Canadian Academy of Health Sciences, a Fellow of the Royal Society of Canada, and a Fellow of the American Mathematical Society.

Professor Wu is the first recipient of the Canadian Applied and Industrial Mathematical Society's Research Prize, for his "very significant contributions in the area of infinite dimensional differential equations with applications to neural networks and population dynamics". He also received the 2019 CAIMS-Fields Industrial Mathematics Prize "in recognition of their many contributions to dynamical systems in mathematical epidemiology and in particular, their collaborative research with public health professionals in government and industry: applying their expert knowledge to infectious disease mitigation strategies and preparedness.". He received the Queen Elizabeth II Diamond Jubilee Medal from the Government of Canada in 2012. He was awarded an honorary doctorate by the University of Szeged in 2016.

He is recognized for his expertise and contribution in the following fields: nonlinear dynamics and delay differential equations; neural networks and pattern recognition; mathematical ecology and epidemiology.

He was awarded the 2024-NSERC Synergy Award for Innovation for his contribution to "creating a research and development ecosystem at the forefront of efforts to revolutionize drug and vaccine development and distribution".

He was elected as a Fellow of the American Mathematical Society, in the 2025 class of fellows.

== Notable projects ==
During the COVID-19 pandemic, he was asked by the Fields Institute to establish and lead The National COVID-19 Modelling Rapid Response Task Force; and he is appointed to the following provincial and federal committees: The Province of Ontario COVID-19 Modelling Consensus Table; The PHAC's External Modelling Expert Group of the Public Health Agency of Canada; The Canada's Expert Panel on COVID-19 Subcommittee on Modelling chaired by the Chief Science Advisor of Canada; and the COVID-19 Vaccine Modelling Task Group, National Advisory Committee on Immunization. In these capacities, he has been a major player to provide the mathematical modelling and analyses informing public health decision making. He received the Award of Excellence from the Ontario Ministry of Colleagues and Universities in September 2020.

Wu co-leads The Mathematics for Public Health (MfPH), along with the Fields Director, V. Kumar Murty.

Dr. Wu led several large-scale interdisciplinary projects including: Transmission Dynamics and Spatial Spread of Infectious Diseases: Modelling, Prediction and Control (funded by the Canadian Network of Centers of Excellence/NCE Mitacs/Mprime); Geo-simulation tools for Simulating Spatial-temporal Spread Patterns and Evaluating Health Outcomes of Communicable Diseases (funded by the Canadian Network of Centers of Excellence/NCE Geomatics). Both projects developed a strong academic-public-industry partnership to address key public health issues relevant to emerging infectious diseases including SARS, pandemic influenza, Ebola, Lyme disease and West Nile virus. He also established and co-led the project: Development of an Antimicrobial Resistance Diversity Index (ARDI) to Guide Initiatives and Investment in Public Health, Antimicrobial Stewardship and Infection Control (funded by the Collaborative Health Research Program, a joint effort between the Canadian Institute of Health Research and Natural Sciences and Engineering Research Council of Canada.
