= Moshe Milevsky =

Moshe Arye Milevsky is a professor of finance at the Schulich School of Business at York University, and a member of the Graduate Faculty in the Department of Mathematics & Statistics, in Toronto, Canada, where he has been based and teaching for over 25 years. He earned a B.A. in mathematics and physics from Yeshiva University in 1990, an M.A. in mathematics and statistics from York University in 1992 and a Ph.D. in business finance from York University in 1996.

His area of expertise is in mathematical financial economics, pensions, insurance, actuarial science and history of financial products. He has done extensive research on exotic option pricing, quantitative personal financial planning (focusing on investment strategies for retiring individuals), insurance derivatives, pensions, annuities, tontines and stochastic mortality models.

He is also the executive director of the Individual Finance and Insurance Decisions Centre (IFID), a non-profit corporation dedicated to generating advanced research at the intersection of wealth management, personal finance, and insurance. For his contributions to the Fields Institute and to the Canadian mathematical community, Moshe was inducted as a Fields Institute Fellow in 2002.

As of 2023, Milevsky was working with Guardian Capital as its chief retirement architect.

Milevsky is the author of 17 books, including the popular Are You a Stock or a Bond, and The 7 Most Important Equations for Your Retirement and the more advanced The Calculus of Retirement Income, which summarizes much of the research that Milevsky has done on quantitative retirement income planning. His recent books include King William's Tontine: Why the Retirement Annuity of the Future Should Resemble Its Past (Cambridge 2015) and The Day the King Defaulted: Financial Lessons from the Stop of the Exchequer in 1672. His book The Religious Roots of Longevity Risk Sharing: The Genesis of Annuity Funds in the Scottish Enlightenment and the Path to Modern Pension Management won the 2026 Kulp-Wright Book Award from the American Risk and Insurance Association for advancing knowledge in the field of insurance and risk management.

== Selected books ==
- Milevsky, Moshe A. (2015). King William's Tontine: Why the Retirement Annuity of the Future should Resurrect its Past. Cambridge: Cambridge University Press. ISBN 978-110-707612-9.
- Milevsky, Moshe; Alexandra Macqueen (2015). Pensionize Your Nest Egg: How to Use Product Allocation to Create a Guaranteed Income for Life. Mississauga: John Wiley & Sons. ISBN 978-0-470-68099-5.
- Milevsky, Moshe (2010). Your Money Milestones: A Guide to Making the 9 Most Important Financial Decisions of Your Life. Upper Saddle River: FT Press. ISBN 978-0-13-702910-5.
- Milevsky, Moshe (2008). Are You a Stock or a Bond?: Create Your Own Pension Plan for a Secure Financial Future. Upper Saddle River: FT Press. ISBN 978-0-13-712737-5.
- Milevsky, Moshe (2006). The Calculus of Retirement Income: Financial Models for Pension Annuities and Life Insurance. New York: Cambridge University Press. ISBN 0-521-84258-1.
- Milevsky, Moshe; Michael Posner (1999). Money Logic: Financial Strategies for the Serious Investor. Toronto: Stoddart. ISBN 0-7737-3171-7.
- Milevsky, Moshe A. (2017). The Day the King Defaulted: Financial Lessons from the Stop of the Exchequer in 1672. Palgrave Macmillan Cham. ISBN 978-3-319-59986-1
- Milevsky, Moshe A. (2012). The 7 Most Important Equations for Your Retirement: The Fascinating People and Ideas Behind Planning Your Retirement Income. Wiley. ISBN 978-1-118-29153-5
