= Wacław Czarnecki =

Polish journalist

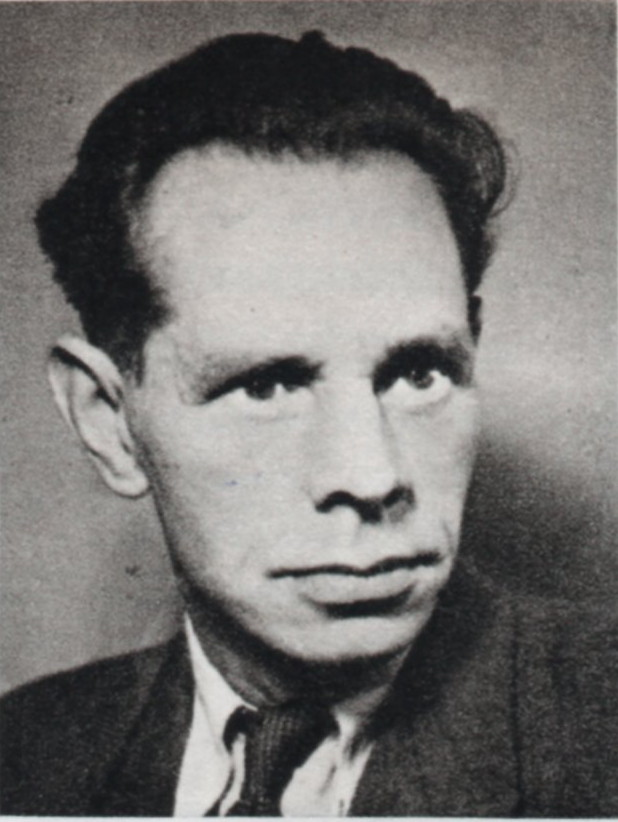
- Born: 2 August 1902; Warsaw, Poland
- Died: 16 May 1990 (aged 87); Warsaw, Poland
- Occupation: journalist

Signature
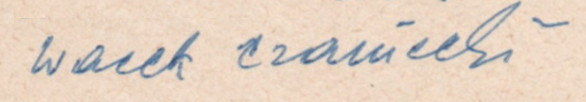

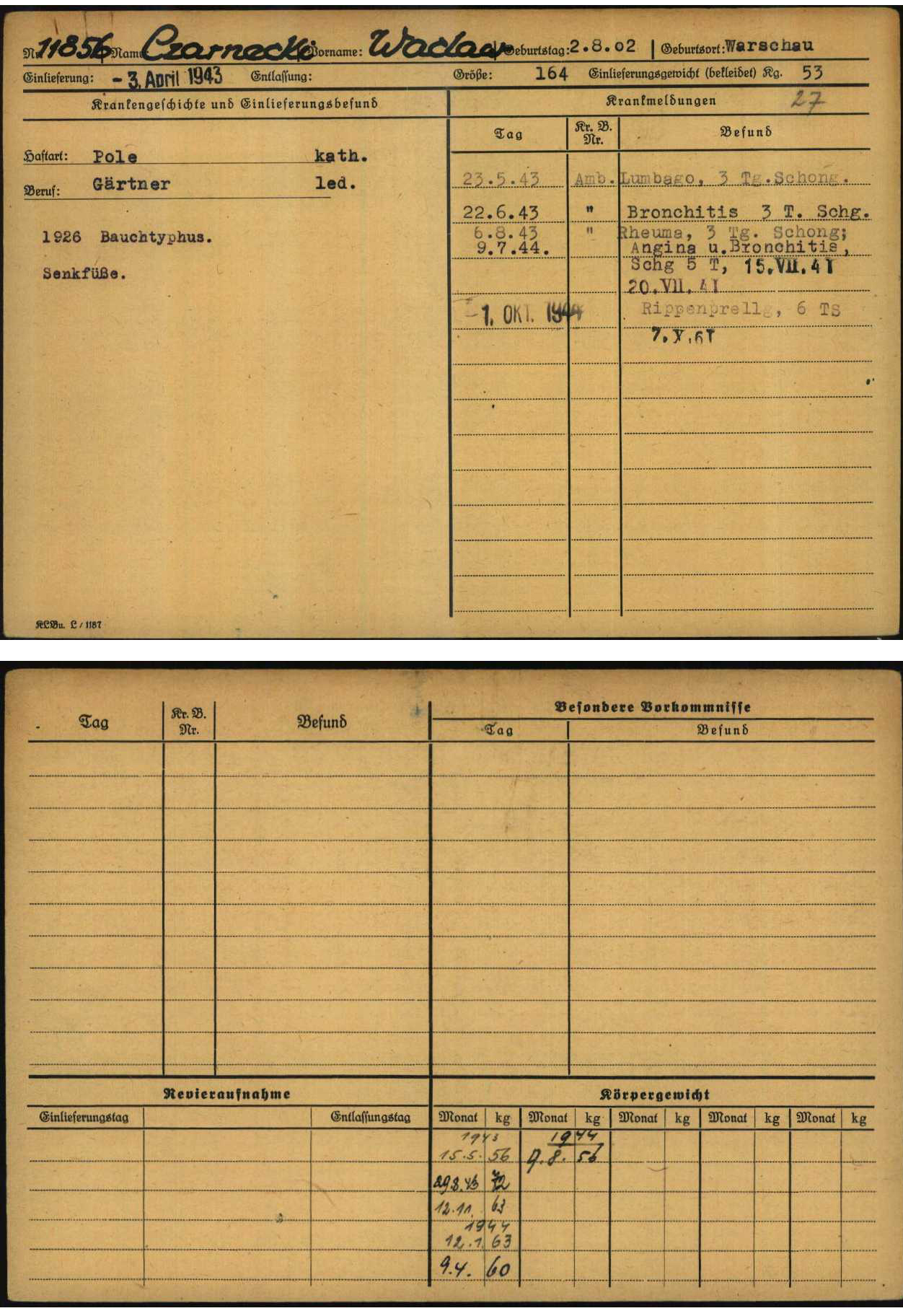
Czarnecki's medical card from the German Nazi Buchenwald Concentration Camp

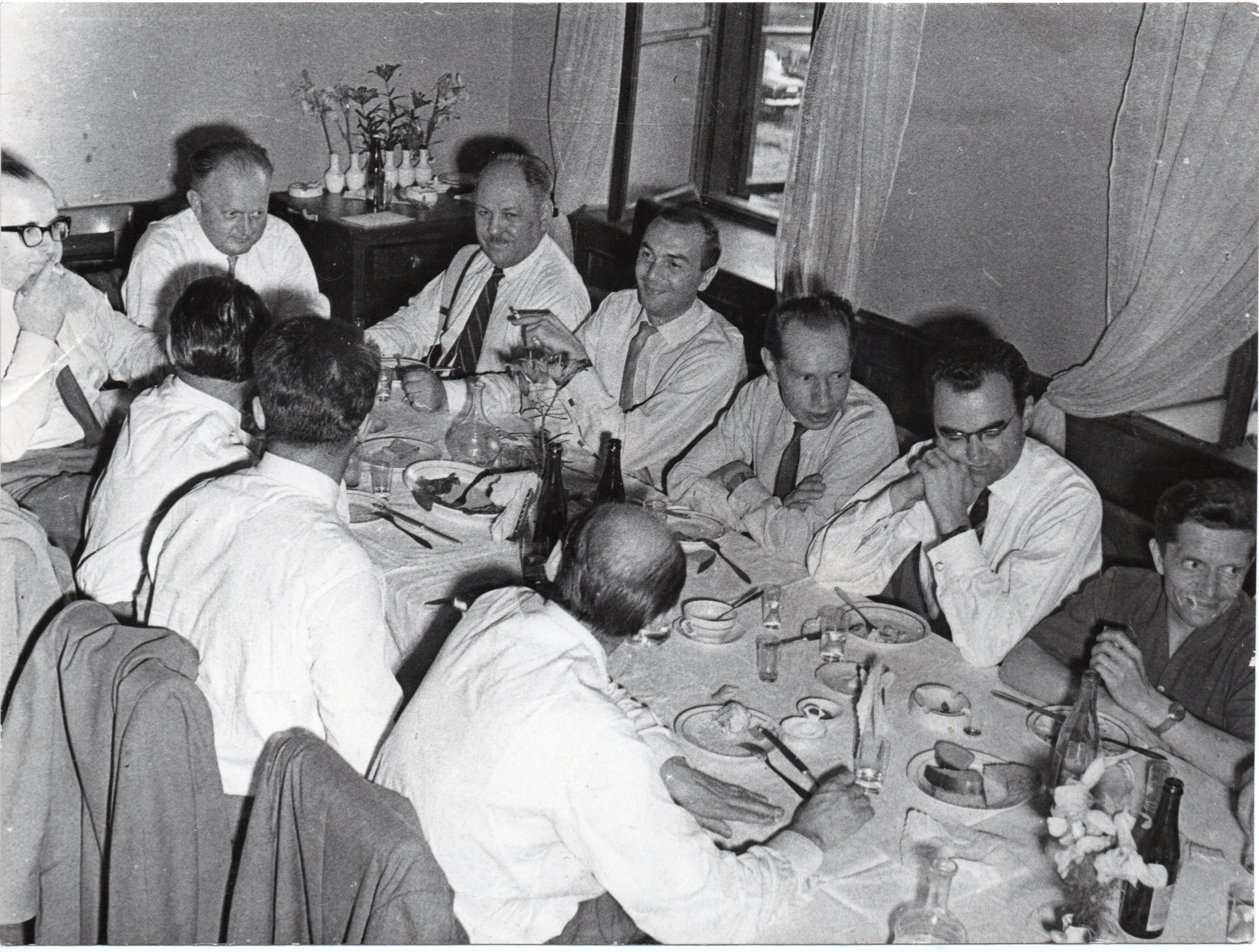
Czarnecki (3rd from the left on the window side) at a meeting of former Polish Buchenwald CC prisoners, fot. Kazimierz Nowicki

Wacław Leon Czarnecki (2 August 1902 – 16 May 1990) a Polish journalist, who before World War II was a member of the Polish Socialist Party; after World War II he was a member of the Society of Fighters for Freedom and Democracy (ZBoWiD) and the Society of Polish Journalists (Stowarzyszenie Dziennikarzy Polskich).

He was a prisoner of the Majdanek and Buchenwald Nazi concentration camps, an active member of secret communist and anti-fascist organisations in Buchenwald; he co-authored (with Zygmunt Zonik) monographs about the Buchenwald concentration camp (inspired by his Buchenwald friend Kazimierz Nowicki) and its sub-camp Mittelbau-Dora.

Wacław Czarnecki died in Warsaw.

== Books ==
- Czarnecki, Wacław; Kuliński, Włodzimierz (1966). Wyzwolenie Buchenwaldu 11 IV 1945 (The Liberation of Buchenwald on 11 April 1945). Warsaw: ZBoWiD. Zarząd Okręgu Warszawskiego. Komisja Historyczna i Propagandowa Klubu Buchenwald-Dora. p. 15.
- Czarnecki, Wacław; Zonik, Zygmunt (1969). Walczący obóz Buchenwald (Buchenwald the Fighting Camp). Warsaw: Książka i Wiedza. pp. XIV, 525.
- Czarnecki, Wacław; Zonik, Zygmunt (1969). Kryptonim Dora (Codeword Dora). Warsaw: Książka i Wiedza. p. 339.
