= Removals (TV series) =

- Also known as: Przeprowadzki
- Created by: Michael Kwieciński
- Directed by: Leszek Wosiewicz
- Creative directors: Krzysztof Ptak; Piotr Śliskowski; Jacek Januszyk
- Starring: Krzysztof Banaszyk; Kinga Preis; Leon Charewicz
- Theme music composer: Michal Lorenc
- Country of origin: Poland
- Original language: Polish
- No. of seasons: 1
- No. of episodes: 10

Production
- Cinematography: Krzysztof Ptak; Piotr Śliskowski; Jacek Januszyk

Original release
- Network: TVP1 (Poland)
- Release: September 2, 2001

Removals (Polish: Przeprowadzki) is a Polish Television drama from 2001, produced and broadcast by TVP1.

== Plot ==
The series follows the story of the Szczygłów family's removal firm, starting from New Year's Eve 1899. It seems that every time they do a removal, an object gets lost. Each episode is centred around this object. The series was intended to follow the Szczygłów family right up to the year 2000, however only episodes up to 1941 were ever produced.

== Cast ==
- Olaf Lubaszenko – Stanisław Szczygieł
- Łukasz Nowicki – Bogdan Szczygieł
- Krzysztof Banaszyk – Czesław Szczygieł
- Artur Janusiak – Mieczysław Szczygieł
- Anna Radwan – Teresa Szczygieł
- Wojciech Majchrzak – Wacław Szczygieł
- Edyta Jungowska – Helena Szczygieł
- Kinga Preis – Róża Żychniewicz-Szczygieł
- Leon Charewicz – Róża's father
- Maja Ostaszewska – Celina, wife of Mieczysława Szczygieł
- Mirosław Jękot – Bank Manager

== Crew ==
Andrzej Haliński was a set designer.

== Episodes ==
| Ep. | English title | Polish Title | Set in (year) |
|---|---|---|---|
| 01 | Lilianna's Bag | Kufer Lilianny | 1900 |
| 02 | Roza's Glass Ball | Szklana Kula Róży | 1901 |
| 03 | The Cabinet of the General's Wife | Serwantka Generałowej | 1905 |
| 04 | The Sofa of Doctor Reutt | Kanapa Doktora Reutta | 1914 |
| 05 | The Saucepan of the Master Cook | Rondel Kuchmistrza Sokołka | 1918 |
| 06 | The Chamber Port of Miss Agata | Nocknik Panny Agaty Turskiej | 1920 |
| 07 | The Portrait of Nobody | Niczyj Portret | 1926 |
| 08 | The Grand Piano of Prince Dowgillo | Steinway Ordynata | 1929 |
| 09 | The First Light-Cavalry Regiment | Sejf 1-go Pułku Szwoleżerów | 1939 |
| 10 | The Wardrobe of Brigadier Abramek | Szafa Brygadiera Abramka | 1941 |
