= 1933–34 Polska Liga Hokejowa season =

Polish ice hockey season

The 1933–34 Polska Liga Hokejowa season was the seventh season of the Polska Liga Hokejowa, the top level of ice hockey in Poland. Four teams participated in the final round, and AZS Posen won the championship.

== Qualification ==
- Lechia Lwów - KS Cracovia 2:1
- Czarni Lwów - KTH Krynica 5:2

== Final Tournament ==
| | Club | GP | Goals | Pts |
|---|---|---|---|---|
| 1. | AZS Poznań | 3 | 5:2 | 6 |
| 2. | Czarni Lwów | 3 | 3:2 | 4 |
| 3. | Lechia Lwów | 3 | 1:3 | 1 |
| 4. | Legia Warszawa | 3 | 0:2 | 1 |
