= Włodzimierz Ławniczak =

Polish journalist and television executive

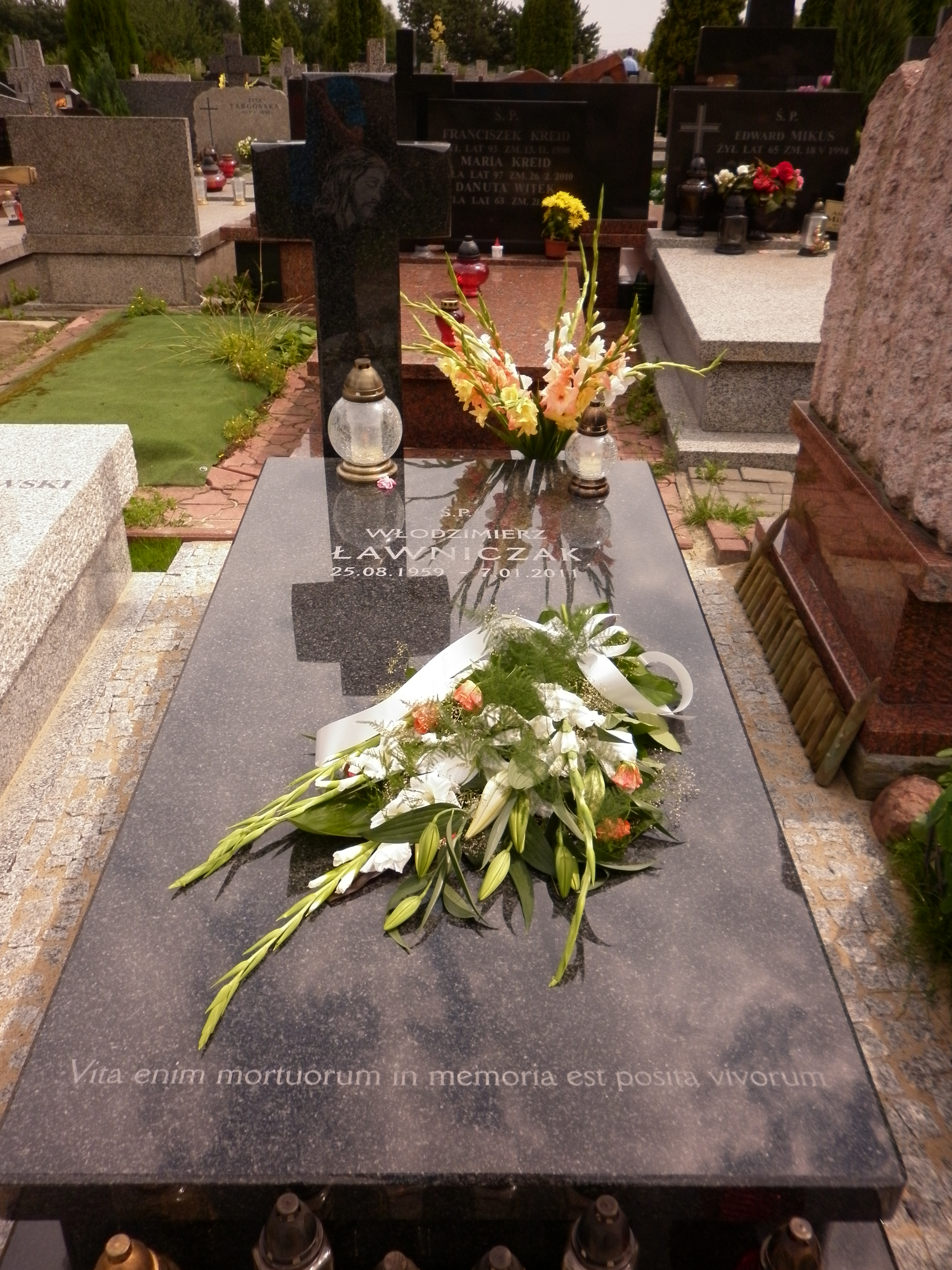
Włodzimierz Ławniczak tomb at the Służew Old Cemetery in Warsaw, Poland

Włodzimierz Ławniczak (25 August 1959 – 7 January 2011) was a Polish journalist and television executive. He served as the acting President of Telewizja Polska, which is Poland's public broadcasting corporation, from 27 August 2010 until 10 December 2010.

Włodzimierz Ławniczak was born in Konin, Poland, on 25 August 1959. Ławniczak graduated with a degree telecommunications engineering from the University of Technology and Life Sciences in Bydgoszcz.

He worked as the deputy editor of the Zrzeszenie Studentów Polskich (Polish Students' Association) from 1990 to 1991 and the director of the Biura Reklamy TVP, the advertising office of Telewizja Polska, from 2001 to 2004. Ławniczak also served as a member of the executive Polkomtel Spółka Akcyjna (Polish telecommunications company) from 2005 until 2007. He was a member of the board of directors of Telewizja Polska from December 2009 until his death on 2 January 2011.

On 27 August 2010 the Rada Nadzorcza, or supervisory board, appointed a new board of directors, with Ławniczak as the chairman and recalled previous chairman, Boguslaw Szwedo. Board member Przemyslaw Tejkowski was also suspended. Both actions were done on recommendation of the Prawo i Sprawiedliwość (Law and Justice party). It was not until 20 September that year that the court entered an appeal to KRS (Krajowy Rejestr Sądowy -The Polish Companies House) Supervisory Board members, but not yet introduced to set the record of President.

Włodzimierz Ławniczak died of a long illness on 2 January 2011 at the age of 51. His funeral was held in Warsaw, at the Służew Old Cemetery.
