= Jean-Pierre Hubaux =

Swiss-Belgian computer scientist

Professor Jean-Pierre Hubaux
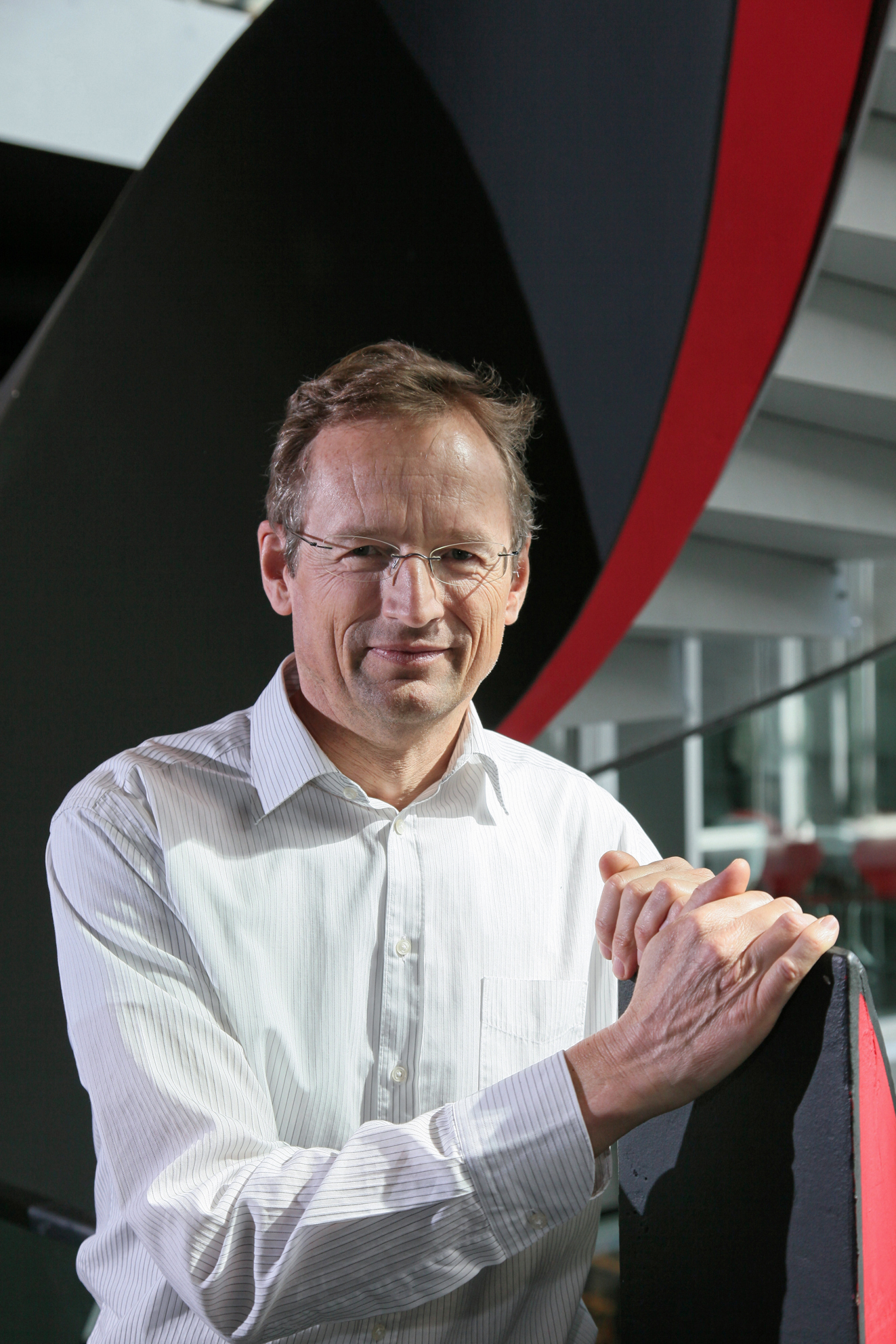
- Jean-Pierre Hubaux in 2011
- Born: Liège, Belgium
- Citizenship: Switzerland; Belgium
- Known for: Information security Privacy; Networking; Privacy-Preserving federated learning

Academic background
- Education: Computer science
- Alma mater: Polytechnic University of Milan

Academic work
- Discipline: Computer science
- Sub-discipline: Security; Privacy
- Institutions: EPFL (École Polytechnique Fédérale de Lausanne)
- Main interests: Security; Privacy
- Website: https://lds.epfl.ch

Jean-Pierre Hubaux is a Swiss-Belgian computer scientist specialised in security and privacy. He is a professor of computer science at EPFL (École Polytechnique Fédérale de Lausanne) and is the head of the Laboratory for Data Security at EPFL's School of Computer and Communication Sciences.

== Career ==
Born in Belgium, Hubaux grew up in Italy. He studied computer science and obtained his Laurea/Dr.-Eng degree in engineering at Polytechnic University of Milan. He then joined the French telecom company Alcatel, where he dedicated his work during the following 10 years primarily to switching systems, architecture, and software.

He joined EPFL as an associate professor in 1990 and was made full professor in 1996. Since 1990, he has been the head of what is now known as the Laboratory for Data Security at EPFL's School of Computer and Communication sciences. In visiting positions, he worked at the Thomas J. Watson Research Center and at the University of California, Berkeley.

Since 2017, Hubaux has been the founding academic director of the Center for Digital Trust (C4DT). The C4DT addresses contemporary trust issues observed on the Internet. It promotes joint research projects, educational programs, and public events, and it comprises 35 EPFL affiliated laboratories and a dozen of external partners.

Hubaux is a co-founder of start-up Tune Insight.

== Research ==
Hubaux's research is currently dedicated to issues of data sharing and protection in personalized healthcare. Formerly, he worked on privacy and security in mobile and pervasive networks, and on inter-personal privacy problems.

His work in data protection in personalized healthcare led to the development of a system able to train and perform inference with neural networks on decentralized data-sets while preserving the privacy of the data and protecting the model. He is coordinating the development of a novel technique for the efficient bootstrapping in fully homomorphic encryption and in advancing this technique for practical implementation. He has also led efforts to show that combining secure multi-party computation and homomorphic encryption makes partial results of federated learning anonymous in accordance to GDPR. This research, was carried out in the framework of the MedCo and Data Protection for Personalized Health projects.

Previously, Hubaux's research was dedicated to the security and privacy of wireless networks. In the field of mobile ad hoc networks, he developed denial-of-service attacks to assess the impact caused by difficult-to-detect attacks. Furthermore he conducted research in the security and privacy vulnerabilities of vehicular ad hoc networks, in the quantification of location privacy in cellular networks, in the application of game theory to wireless networks in order to anticipate network behavior in case wireless nodes depart from the prescribed protocol, and in the robustness of sensor networks; he also showed how sensor nodes can evade jamming attacks by exploiting channel diversity. Finally, he investigated inter-personal privacy issues caused by the online sharing of information such as photos of groups of people or genomes.

He was a member of the Scientific Advisory Board of Sophia Genetics (2012-2018) and a member of the Swiss Communication Commission (Commission des Communications; 2007-2019). He is co-chair of the Data Security Work Stream of the Global Alliance for Genomics and Health.

An introduction to Hubaux's recent research is available in two public lectures on "MedCo: Enabling the Secure and Privacy-preserving Exploration and Analysis of Distributed Clinical and *Omics Cohorts" (2020), and on "Secure Sharing of Health Data", presented as the keynote at the European Conference on Security and Privacy (2020).

At some point, he contributed also to the development of the COVID-19 contact tracing app SwissCovid.

Among others, the privacy-preserving still accountable ride-hailing service project ORide received coverage in news outlets such as Wired, International Business Times, ans Engadget.

== Distinctions ==
Hubaux is an IEEE Fellow (2009) for contributions to wireless security, and ACM Fellow (2010).

In 2021, he received the Test of Time Award from the IEEE Symposium on Security and Privacy. Together with his co-authors, he is the recipient of awards from the IEEE Symposium on Security and Privacy for the papers on "GenoGuard: Protecting Genomic Data against Brute-Force Attacks" (2015) and for "On Enforcing the Digital Immunity of a Large Humanitarian Organization" (2018). He was the recipient of the 2016 Reginald Fessenden Award from the ACM International Conference on Modeling, Analysis and Simulation of Wireless and Mobile Systems.

== Selected works ==
=== Book ===
- Buttyán, Levente; Hubaux, Jean-Pierre (29 November 2007). Security and Cooperation in Wireless Networks: Thwarting Malicious and Selfish Behavior in the Age of Ubiquitous Computing. Cambridge University Press. ISBN 978-0-521-87371-0.

=== Papers ===
- Sav, Sinem; Pyrgelis, Apostolos; Troncoso-Pastoriza, Juan Ramón; Froelicher, David; Bossuat, Jean-Philippe; Sousa, Joao Sa; Hubaux, Jean-Pierre (2021). "POSEIDON: Privacy-Preserving Federated Neural Network Learning". Proceedings 2021 Network and Distributed System Security Symposium. doi:10.14722/ndss.2021.24119. ISBN 978-1-891562-66-2. S2CID 221397230.
- Froelicher, David; Troncoso-Pastoriza, Juan R.; Raisaro, Jean Louis; Cuendet, Michel A.; Sousa, Joao Sa; Fellay, Jacques; Hubaux, Jean-Pierre (2021). "Truly Privacy-Preserving Federated Analytics for Precision Medicine with Multiparty Homomorphic Encryption". Nature Communications. 12 (1): 5910. Bibcode:2021NatCo..12.5910F. bioRxiv 10.1101/2021.02.24.432489. doi:10.1038/s41467-021-25972-y. PMC 8505638. PMID 34635645. S2CID 232081916.
- Scheibner, James; Raisaro, Jean Louis; Troncoso-Pastoriza, Juan Ramón; Ienca, Marcello; Fellay, Jacques; Vayena, Effy; Hubaux, Jean-Pierre (2021). "Revolutionizing Medical Data Sharing Using Advanced Privacy-Enhancing Technologies: Technical, Legal, and Ethical Synthesis". Journal of Medical Internet Research. 23 (2) e25120. doi:10.2196/25120. PMC 7952236. PMID 33629963.
- Aad, Imad; Hubaux, Jean-Pierre; Knightly, Edward W. (2004). "Denial of service resilience in ad hoc networks". Proceedings of the 10th annual international conference on Mobile computing and networking - Mobi Com '04. p. 202. doi:10.1145/1023720.1023741. ISBN 1-58113-868-7. S2CID 1796708.
- Raya, Maxim; Hubaux, Jean-Pierre (2007). "Securing vehicular ad hoc networks". Journal of Computer Security. 15: 39–68. doi:10.3233/JCS-2007-15103.
- Shokri, Reza; Theodorakopoulos, George; Le Boudec, Jean-Yves; Hubaux, Jean-Pierre (2011). "Quantifying Location Privacy". 2011 IEEE Symposium on Security and Privacy (PDF). pp. 247–262. doi:10.1109/SP.2011.18. ISBN 978-1-4577-0147-4. S2CID 5705385.
- Manshaei, Mohammad Hossein; Zhu, Quanyan; Alpcan, Tansu; Bacşar, Tamer; Hubaux, Jean-Pierre (2013). "Game theory meets network security and privacy". ACM Computing Surveys. 45 (3): 1–39. doi:10.1145/2480741.2480742. S2CID 207203993.
- Cagalj, Mario; Capkun, Srdjan; Hubaux, Jean-Pierre (2007). "Wormhole-Based Antijamming Techniques in Sensor Networks". IEEE Transactions on Mobile Computing. 6: 100–114. Bibcode:2007ITMC....6..100C. doi:10.1109/TMC.2007.250674.
- Olteanu, Alexandra-Mihaela; Huguenin, Kevin; Dacosta, Italo; Hubaux, Jean-Pierre (2018). "Consensual and Privacy-Preserving Sharing of Multi-Subject and Interdependent Data". Proceedings 2018 Network and Distributed System Security Symposium. doi:10.14722/ndss.2018.23002. ISBN 978-1-891562-49-5. S2CID 51951403.
- Humbert, Mathias; Ayday, Erman; Hubaux, Jean-Pierre; Telenti, Amalio (2017). "Quantifying Interdependent Risks in Genomic Privacy". ACM Transactions on Privacy and Security. 20: 1–31. doi:10.1145/3035538. hdl:11693/49405. S2CID 5574435.
