= Fields Institute =

Canadian centre for mathematical research

Fields Institute for Research in Mathematical Sciences

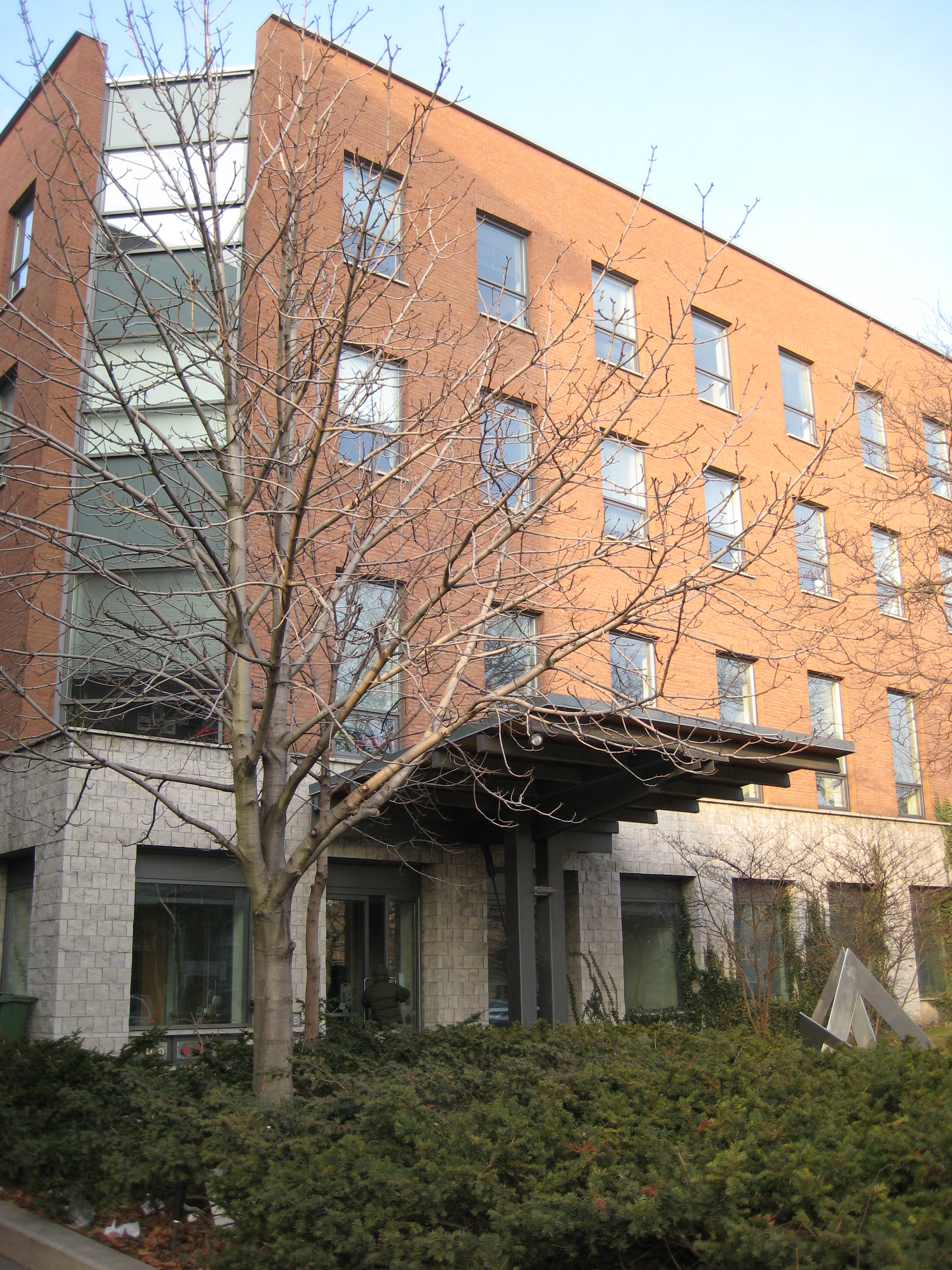
- The exterior of the Fields Institute
- Named after: John Charles Fields
- Formation: 1992
- Founded at: University of Waterloo
- Type: Educational institute
- Headquarters: University of Toronto St. George
- Location(s): 222 College Street; Toronto, Ontario, Canada
- Coordinates: 43.658813°N 79.397574°W
- Methods: Collaboration and study
- Fields: Mathematical
- Affiliations: Brock University; Lakehead University; Iowa State University; Nipissing University; Royal Military College of Canada; Toronto Metropolitan University; University of Guelph; University of Houston; Université Lille 1; University of Manitoba; University of Ontario Institute of Technology; University of Saskatchewan; University of Toronto; University of Waterloo; University of Windsor; Trent University; Wilfrid Laurier University; York University
- Website: www.fields.utoronto.ca

The Fields Institute for Research in Mathematical Sciences, commonly known simply as the Fields Institute, is an international centre for scientific research in mathematical sciences. It is an independent non-profit with strong ties to 20 Ontario universities, including the University of Toronto, where it occupies a purpose-built building on the St. George campus. Fields was established in 1992, and was briefly based at the University of Waterloo before relocating to Toronto in 1995.

The institute is named after Canadian mathematician John Charles Fields, after whom the Fields Medal is also named. Fields' name was given to the institute in recognition of his contributions to mathematics and his work on behalf of high level mathematical scholarship in Canada.

As a centre for mathematical activity, the institute brings together mathematicians from Canada and abroad. It also supports the collaboration between professional mathematicians and researchers in other domains, such as statistics, computer science, engineering, physical and biological sciences, medicine, economics and finance, telecommunications and information systems. It also holds monthly meetings on mathematics education, attended by participants from secondary school boards, university mathematics departments and the private sector.

== Building ==
The institute occupies a building at the university that was specially conceived and constructed for its activities, designed by Kuwabara Payne McKenna Blumberg Architects.

The building accommodates up to 66 visitors and their support staff, providing office spaces and full access to the mathematics collection of the University of Toronto Libraries.

== Publications ==
The Fields Institute Monographs (FIM), jointly published with the American Mathematical Society, features the research work of the institute.

== Fellows ==
In 2002, the Fields Institute initiated the Fields Institute Fellows program to recognize outstanding contributions to activities at the Fields Institute and within the Canadian mathematical community. The fellowship is a lifetime appointment. Winners of the CRM-Fields-PIMS prize are automatically recommended for fellowship.
