= Tamás Terlaky =

Hungarian mathematician (born 1955)

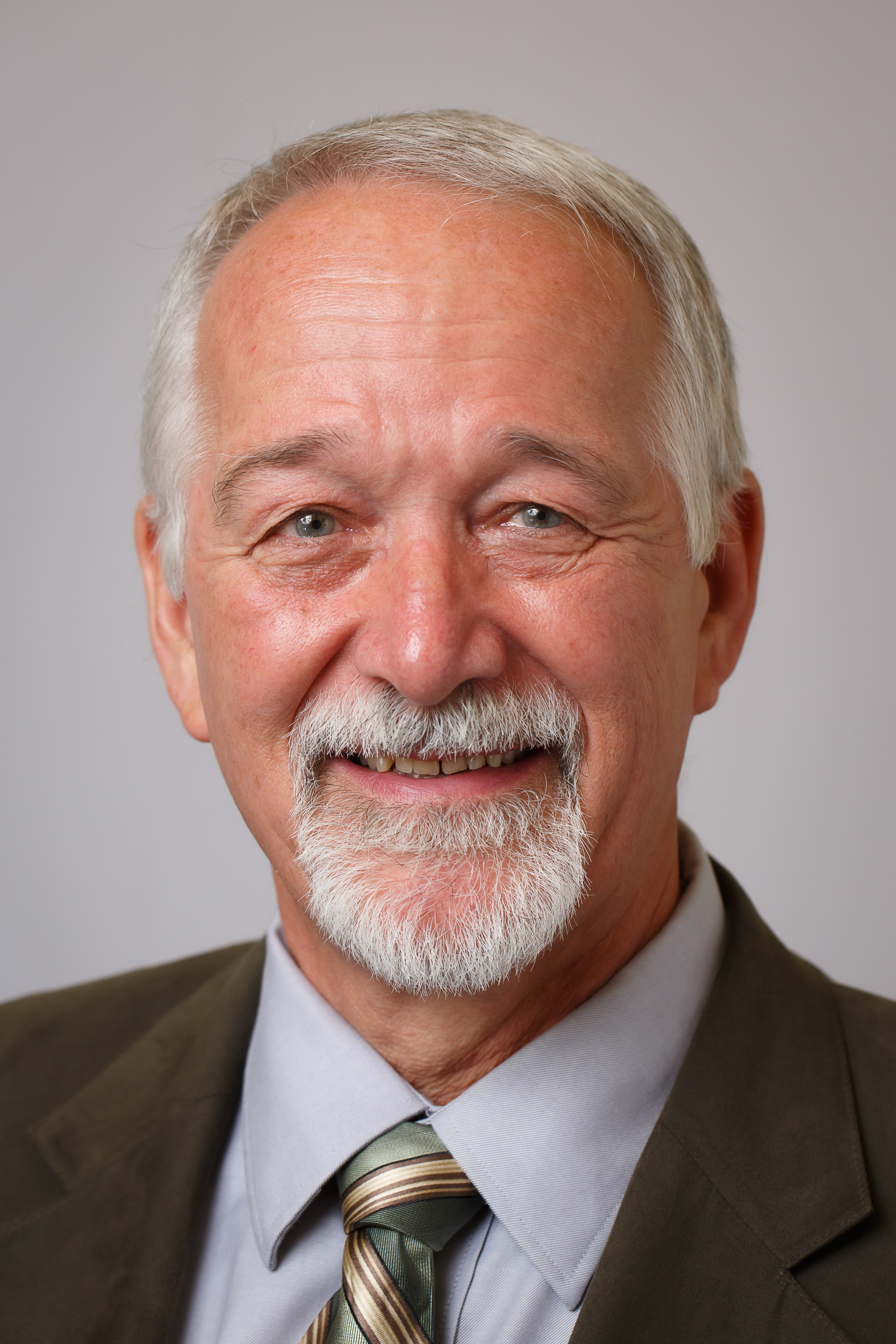
- Born: January 10, 1955 (age 71); Kaposvár, Hungary
- Occupations: Mathematician and optimizer
- Known for: Criss-cross algorithms and optimization
- Spouse: Gabriella Terlaky Török
- Children: 1
- Awards: Fellow of The Fields Institute (2005); Fellow of INFORMS (2017); Fellow of SIAM (2018); Fellow of the Canadian Academy of Engineering (2020); Fellow of IFORS (2021)

Academic background
- Education: Eötvös Loránd University
- Thesis: (1981)
- Doctoral advisor: Emil Klafszky

Academic work
- Institutions: Eötvös Loránd University, Budapest, Hungary; Delft University of Technology, The Netherlands; McMaster University, Hamilton, Ontario, Canada; Lehigh University, Bethlehem, Pennsylvania, US
- Main interests: Optimization

Tamás Terlaky is a Hungarian-Canadian-American professor of Industrial and Systems Engineering at Lehigh University. He is especially well known for his work on criss-cross algorithms, interior-point methods, Klee-Minty examples for path following algorithms, and optimization.

== Biography ==
Terlaky was born on January 10, 1955, in Kaposvár, Hungary. He studied Mathematics and Operations Research at the Eötvös Loránd University in Budapest, Hungary. He earned his Ph.D. in 1981 under the supervision of Emil Klafszky. Terlaky taught at Eötvös Loránd University from 1981 to 1989; at the Delft University of Technology from 1989 to 1999; and at McMaster University in Hamilton, Ontario from 1999 to 2008, when he moved to Lehigh University. At Lehigh, he holds the George N. and Soteria Kledaras Endowed Chair. From 2008 to 2017, he served as the Chair of the Industrial and Systems Engineering Department. Since 2020 he is Director of the Quantum Computing and Optimization Laboratory.

He was founding Chair (2000) and since 2003 Honorary Chair of EUROPT, The Continuous Optimization Working group of EURO. From 2017 to 2019, he was elected as Chair of the SIAM Activity Group of Optimization, elected Vice President of INFORMS (2019-2022), since 2020 Editor in Chief of the Journal of Optimization Theory and Applications.

== Career ==
In 1985 and 1987, Terlaky independently published on the criss-cross algorithm. The theory of oriented matroids has also been used by Terlaky and Zhang (1991) to prove that their criss-cross algorithms have finite termination for linear programming problems.

Terlaky has previously taught at Eötvös Loránd University and Delft University of Technology. From 1999 to 2008, he was Professor at the Department of Computing and Software at McMaster University, and was also the founding director of the School of Computational Engineering and Science at the same university.

In 2020, Terlaky, along with Luis Zuluaga and Boris Defourny, was the recipient of a large quantum computing research grant from DARPA.

Terlaky is also a founding editor-in-chief of Optimization and Engineering (founded in 1998), a journal specializing in mathematical optimization and its applications. He has served on numerous editorial boards, including the Journal of Optimization Theory and Applications, Computational Optimization and Applications, European Journal on Operational research, Optimization Methods and Software, Optimization Letters, and Journal of Computational Sciences.

== Recognition ==
Terlaky has been elected as:

- 2005: Fellow of the Fields Institute
- 2017: Fellow of the Institute for Operations Research and the Management Sciences (INFORMS)
- 2018: Fellow of the Society for Industrial and Applied Mathematics (SIAM)
- 2020: Fellow of the Canadian Academy of Engineering
- 2021: Fellow of the International Federation of Operational Research Societies (IFORS)

In 2017, he was awarded the 2017 Daniel H. Wagner Prize for Excellence in Operations Research Practice for helping to improve algorithmic efficiency at the Pennsylvania Department of Corrections by creating the unique Inmate Assignment Decision Support System (IADSS).

Also, in 2019, for his pioneering work in correctional systems, he was awarded the Outstanding Innovation in Service Systems Engineering award by the Institute of Industrial Engineers (IISE).

He gave several plenary and keynote talks at major conferences, including the International Symposium on Mathematical Programming 2024.

Additional awards:

- Award of Merit of the Canadian Operations Research Society (2015)
- Egerváry Award of the Hungarian Operations Research Society (2017)
- Farkas Award of the János Bolyai Mathematical Society of Hungary (1985)
- Four-time finalist of the George D. Smith Prizre of INFORMS-UPS (2021, 2013, 2014, 2015)
- Distinguished Visiting Professor Award, the University of Pannonia, Veszprém, Hungary (2018)

== Selected publications ==
=== Books ===
- Roos, Cornelis; Terlaky, Tamás; Vial, Jean-Philippe (1997). Interior Point Approach to Linear Optimization: Theory and Algorithms. John Wiley & Sons, Chichester, New York, (second print by Springer Science (1998).
- Peng, Jiming; Roos, Cornelis; Terlaky, Tamás (2002). Self-Regularity: A New Paradigm for Primal-Dual Interior Point Methods. Princeton University Press.
- Terlaky, Tamás (editor) (1996). Interior Point Methods in Mathematical Programming. Kluwer Academic Publisher, Dordrecht, The Netherlands.
- Terlaky, Tamás; Anjos, Miguel F.; Ahmed, Shabbir (editors) (2017). Handbook of Advances and Trends in Optimization with Engineering Applications, Advances and Trends in Optimization with Engineering Applications. MOS-SIAM Book Series on Optimization, SIAM, Philadelphia.

=== Papers ===
Terlaky has published over 250 papers, some of which are:

- Fukuda, Komei; Terlaky, Tamás (1997). Liebling, Thomas M.; de Werra, Dominique (eds.). "Criss-cross methods: A fresh view on pivot algorithms". Mathematical Programming, Series B. 79 (Papers from the 16th International Symposium on Mathematical Programming held in Lausanne, 1997, number 1–3): 369–395. doi:10.1007/BF02614325. MR 1464775. S2CID 2794181. Postscript preprint.
- den Hertog, Dick; Roos, Cornelis; Terlaky, Tamás (1 July 1993). "The linear complementarity problem, sufficient matrices, and the criss-cross method" (PDF). Linear Algebra and Its Applications. 187: 1–14. doi:10.1016/0024-3795(93)90124-7. MR 1221693.
- Illés, Tibor; Szirmai, Ákos; Terlaky, Tamás (1999). "The finite criss-cross method for hyperbolic programming". European Journal of Operational Research. 114 (1): 198–214. doi:10.1016/S0377-2217(98)00049-6. Zbl 0953.90055. Postscript preprint.
- Klafszky, Emil; Terlaky, Tamás (1991). "The role of pivoting in proving some fundamental theorems of linear algebra". Linear Algebra and Its Applications. 151: 97–118. doi:10.1016/0024-3795(91)90356-2. MR 1102142.
- Terlaky, Tamás (1985). "A convergent criss-cross method". Optimization: A Journal of Mathematical Programming and Operations Research. 16 (5): 683–690. doi:10.1080/02331938508843067. ISSN 0233-1934. MR 0798939.
- Terlaky, Tamás (1987). "A finite crisscross method for oriented matroids". Journal of Combinatorial Theory. Series B. 42 (3): 319–327. doi:10.1016/0095-8956(87)90049-9. ISSN 0095-8956. MR 0888684.
- Terlaky, Tamás; Zhang, Shu Zhong (1993). "Pivot rules for linear programming: A Survey on recent theoretical developments". Annals of Operations Research. 46–47: 203–233. doi:10.1007/BF02096264. ISSN 0254-5330. MR 1260019. S2CID 6058077.
- Illés, Tibor; Szirmai, Ákos; Terlaky, Tamás (1999). "The finite criss-cross method for hyperbolic programming". European Journal of Operational Research. 114 (1): 198–214. doi:10.1016/S0377-2217(98)00049-6. ISSN 0377-2217. PDF preprint.
- Roos, C. (1990). "An exponential example for Terlaky's pivoting rule for the criss-cross simplex method". Mathematical Programming. Series A. 46 (1): 79–84. doi:10.1007/BF01585729. MR 1045573. S2CID 33463483.
- Terlaky, Tamás (1985). "A convergent criss-cross method". Optimization: A Journal of Mathematical Programming and Operations Research. 16 (5): 683–690. doi:10.1080/02331938508843067. ISSN 0233-1934. MR 0798939.
- Terlaky, Tamás (1987). "A finite crisscross method for oriented matroids". Journal of Combinatorial Theory. Series B. 42 (3): 319–327. doi:10.1016/0095-8956(87)90049-9. ISSN 0095-8956. MR 0888684.
- Gondzio, Jacek; Terlaky, Tamás (1996). "A computational view of interior point methods". In J. E. Beasley (ed.). Advances in linear and integer programming. Oxford Lecture Series in Mathematics and its Applications. Vol. 4. New York: Oxford University Press. pp. 103–144. MR 1438311. Postscript file at website of Gondzio.
- Pólik, Imre; Terlaky, Tamás (2007) "A survey of the S-lemma" SIAM Review 49 (3), 371-418.
- Bomze, Immanuael; Dür, Mirjam; De Klerk, Etienne; Roos, Cornelis; Quist, Arie; Terlaky, Tamás (2000) "On copositive programming and standard quadratic optimization problems" Journal of Global Optimization 18 (4), 301-320.
- Nemirovski, Arkadii; Roos, Cornelis; Terlaky; Tamás (1999) "On maximization of quadratic form over intersection of ellipsoids with common center" Mathematical Programming 86 (3), 463-473.
- Shahabsafa, Mohammad; Terlaky, Tamás; Gudapati, Chaitanya; Sharma, Anshul; Plebani, Louis; Wilson, George; Bucklen, Kristofer (2018) "The Inmate Assignment and Scheduling Problem and its Application in the PA Department of Correction", Interfaces 48 (5), 467-483.
- Andersen, Erling D.; Roos, Cornelis; Terlaky, Tamás (2003) "On implementing a primal-dual interior-point method for conic quadratic optimization" Mathematical Programming 95 (2), 249-277.
- De Klerk, Etienne; Roos, Cornelis; Terlaky, Tamás (1997) "Initialization in semidefinite programming via a self-dual skew-symmetric embedding" Operations Research Letters 20 (5), 213-221.
- Deza, Nematollahi & Terlaky (2008) Deza, Antoine; Nematollahi, Eissa; Terlaky, Tamás (May 2008). "How good are interior point methods? Klee–Minty cubes tighten iteration-complexity bounds". Mathematical Programming. 113 (1): 1–14. CiteSeerX 10.1.1.214.111. doi:10.1007/s10107-006-0044-x. MR 2367063
- Mohammadisiahroudi, Mohammahossein; Augustino, Brandon; Sampourmahani, Pouya; Terlaky, Tamás (2024). "Quantum computing inspired iterative refinement for semidefinite optimization". Mathematical Programming. January 2025. doi:10.1007/s10107-024-02183-z.
- Wu, Zeguan; Sampourmahani, Pouya; Mohammadisiahroudi, Mohammahossein; Terlaky, Tamás (2025). "A Quantum Dual Logarithmic Barrier Method for Linear Optimization". Mathematical Programming. January 2025. https://pubsonline.informs.org/doi/10.1287/ijoo.2024.0062.
- Mohammadisiahroudi, Mohammahossein; Wu, Zeguan; Sampourmahani, Pouya; You, Jun-Kai; Terlaky, Tamás (2025). "Optimal Scaling Quantum Interior Point Method for Linear Optimization". arXiv. December 2025. https://arxiv.org/pdf/2512.04510

== See also ==
- Criss-cross algorithm
- Interior-point method
- Klee–Minty cube
- Quantum Computing and Optimization: https://qcol.lehigh.edu/
- https://www.youtube.com/watch?v=l71yMdECCUk&t=2405s
