= Polymatroid =

Multiset analogue of matroids

In mathematics, a polymatroid is a polytope associated with a submodular function. The notion was introduced by Jack Edmonds in 1970. It is also a generalization of the notion of a matroid.

== Definition ==
=== Polyhedral definition ===
Let $E$ be a finite set and $f: 2^E\rightarrow \mathbb{R}_{\geq 0}$ a non-decreasing submodular function, that is, for each $A\subseteq B \subseteq E$ we have $f(A)\leq f(B)$, and for each $A, B \subseteq E$ we have $f(A)+f(B) \geq f(A\cup B) + f(A\cap B)$. We define the polymatroid associated to $f$ to be the following polytope:

$$P_f= \Big\{\textbf{x}\in \mathbb{R}_{\geq 0}^E~\Big|~\sum_{e\in U}\textbf{x}(e)\leq f(U), \forall U\subseteq E\Big\}$$.

When we allow the entries of $\textbf{x}$ to be negative we denote this polytope by $EP_f$, and call it the extended polymatroid associated to $f$.

=== Matroidal definition ===
In matroid theory, polymatroids are defined as the pair consisting of the set and the function as in the above definition. That is, a polymatroid is a pair $(E, f)$ where $E$ is a finite set and $f:2^E\rightarrow \mathbb{R}_{\geq 0}$, or $\mathbb{Z}_{\geq 0},$ is a non-decreasing submodular function. If the codomain is $\mathbb{Z}_{\geq 0},$ we say that $(E,f)$ is an integer polymatroid. We call $E$ the ground set and $f$ the rank function of the polymatroid. This definition generalizes the definition of a matroid in terms of its rank function. A vector $x\in \mathbb{R}_{\geq 0}^E$ is independent if $\sum_{e\in U}x(e)\leq f(U)$ for all $U\subseteq E$. Let $P$ denote the set of independent vectors. Then $P$ is the polytope in the previous definition, called the independence polytope of the polymatroid.

Under this definition, a matroid is a special case of integer polymatroid. While the rank of an element in a matroid can be either $0$ or $1$, the rank of an element in a polymatroid can be any nonnegative real number, or nonnegative integer in the case of an integer polymatroid. In this sense, a polymatroid can be considered a multiset analogue of a matroid.

=== Vector definition ===
Let $E$ be a finite set. If $\textbf{u}, \textbf{v} \in \mathbb{R}^E$ then we denote by $|\textbf{u}|$ the sum of the entries of $\textbf{u}$, and write $\textbf{u} \leq \textbf{v}$ whenever $\textbf{v}(i)-\textbf{u}(i)\geq 0$ for every $i \in E$ (notice that this gives a partial order to $\mathbb{R}_{\geq 0}^E$). A polymatroid on the ground set $E$ is a nonempty compact subset $P$, the set of independent vectors, of $\mathbb{R}_{\geq 0}^E$ such that:

1. If $\textbf{v} \in P$, then $\textbf{u} \in P$ for every $\textbf{u}\leq \textbf{v}.$
2. If $\textbf{u},\textbf{v} \in P$ with $|\textbf{v}|> |\textbf{u}|$, then there is a vector $\textbf{w}\in P$ such that $\textbf{u}<\textbf{w}\leq (\max\{\textbf{u}(1),\textbf{v}(1)\},\dots,\max\{\textbf{u}({|E|}),\textbf{v}({|E|})\}).$

This definition is equivalent to the one described before, where $f$ is the function defined by

$f(A) = \max\Big\{\sum_{i\in A} \textbf{v}(i)~\Big|~ \textbf{v} \in P\Big\}$ for every $A\subseteq E$.

The second property may be simplified to

If $\textbf{u},\textbf{v} \in P$ with $|\textbf{v}|> |\textbf{u}|$, then $(\max\{\textbf{u}(1),\textbf{v}(1)\},\dots,\max\{\textbf{u}({|E|}),\textbf{v}({|E|})\})\in P.$

Then compactness is implied if $P$ is assumed to be bounded.

== Discrete polymatroids ==
A discrete polymatroid or integral polymatroid is a polymatroid for which the codomain of $f$ is $\mathbb{Z}_{\geq 0}$, so the vectors are in $\mathbb{Z}^E_{\geq 0}$ instead of $\mathbb{R}^E_{\geq 0}$. Discrete polymatroids can be understood by focusing on the lattice points of a polymatroid, and are of great interest because of their relationship to monomial ideals.

Discrete polymatroids are related to matroids. Given a positive integer $k$, a discrete polymatroid $(E,f)$ (using the matroidal definition) is a $k$-polymatroid if $f(e) \leq k$ for all $e \in E$. Thus, a $1$-polymatroid is a matroid. Also, for any discrete polymatroid $(E, f)$, there is a matroid whose independent sets are the sets $A \subseteq E$ such that $f(U) \ge |U|$ for all $U \subseteq A$.

== Relation to generalized permutahedra ==
A generalized permutahedron (alternative spelling: permutohedron) is a polytope whose normal fan is a coarsening of the braid fan, defined by the hyperplanes $x_j = x_k$ in $\mathbb{R}^n$; note that the braid fan is the normal fan of the standard permutahedron. Thus the geometry of generalized permutahedra is intimately connected to the combinatorics of the symmetric group.

Alternatively, a generalized permutahedron can be characterized as a polytope obtained by parallel translations of the facets of the standard permutahedron. Thus $P$ is a generalized permutahedron precisely if

$$P = \left\{
x \in \mathbb{R}^n : \,
\sum_{i=1}^n x_i = z_{[n]}, \ \sum_{i \in S} x_i \ge z_S
\, \text{ for all nonempty } \,
S \subseteq [n]
\right\}$$

for some submodular function $z: 2^{[n]} \to \mathbb{R}$.

The 0/1-polytopes among generalized permutahedra are precisely the matroid polytopes.

== Properties ==
$P_f$ is nonempty if and only if $f\geq 0$ and that $EP_f$ is nonempty if and only if $f(\emptyset)\geq 0$.

Given any extended polymatroid $EP$ there is a unique submodular function $f$ such that $f(\emptyset)=0$ and $EP_f=EP$.

== Contrapolymatroids ==
For a supermodular f one analogously may define the contrapolymatroid

$$\Big\{w \in\mathbb{R}_{\geq 0}^E~\Big|~\forall S \subseteq E, \sum_{e\in S}w(e)\ge f(S)\Big\}$$.

This analogously generalizes the dominant of the spanning set polytope of matroids.
