= Reverse search =

Reverse search may refer to:

- Reverse image search, a type of content-based image retrieval
- Reverse-search algorithm, a class of algorithms
- Reverse search warrant, a type of search warrant in the United States

== See also ==
- Search (disambiguation)
