= Vertex enumeration problem =

In mathematics, the vertex enumeration problem for a polytope, a polyhedral cell complex, a hyperplane arrangement, or some other object of discrete geometry, is the problem of determination of the object's vertices given some formal representation of the object. A classical example is the problem of enumeration of the vertices of a convex polytope specified by a set of linear inequalities:

$$Ax \leq b$$

where A is an m×n matrix, x is an n×1 column vector of variables, and b is an m×1 column vector of constants. The inverse (dual) problem of finding the bounding inequalities given the vertices is called facet enumeration (see convex hull algorithms).

== Computational complexity ==
The computational complexity of the problem is a subject of research in computer science. For unbounded polyhedra, the problem is known to be NP-hard, more precisely, there is no algorithm that runs in polynomial time in the combined input-output size, unless P=NP.

A 1992 article by David Avis and Komei Fukuda presents a reverse-search algorithm which finds the v vertices of a polytope defined by a nondegenerate system of n inequalities in d dimensions (or, dually, the v facets of the convex hull of n points in d dimensions, where each facet contains exactly d given points) in time O(ndv) and space O(nd). The v vertices in a simple arrangement of n hyperplanes in d dimensions can be found in O(n^{2}dv) time and O(nd) space complexity. The Avis–Fukuda algorithm adapted the criss-cross algorithm for oriented matroids.

A 2025 article by Zelin Dong, Fenglei Fan, Huan Xiong, and Tieyong Zeng introduced the Zero rule into an optimized reverse-search algorithm. This pivot rule is proven to terminate within d steps. Through a formal analysis of its properties, the rule was integrated into an efficient algorithm, achieving a time complexity O(n^{2}d^{2}(v-v_{d}) + ndv_{d}) where v_{d} denotes the number of dictionaries that reach the terminal state in exactly d pivots under the Zero rule. This becomes O(nd^{4}v) for simple arrangements, improving upon the O(n^{2}dv) complexity of its predecessor.
