= Robert G. Bland =

American mathematician

Robert Gary Bland (born February 25, 1948) is an American mathematician and operations researcher, a professor of operations research and information engineering at Cornell University. He was born in New York City.

Bland did both his undergraduate and graduate studies at Cornell University, earning a bachelor's degree in 1969, M.S. in 1972, and a Ph.D. in 1974 under the supervision of D. R. Fulkerson. He began his faculty career at Binghamton University, but then returned to Cornell in 1978.

Bland is known as one of the inventors of oriented matroids, which he used to define Bland's rule for avoiding cycles in the simplex method for linear programming.
