= Edmonds' algorithm =

Algorithm for the directed version of the minimum spanning tree problem

In graph theory, Edmonds' algorithm or Chu–Liu/Edmonds' algorithm is an algorithm for finding a spanning arborescence of minimum weight (sometimes called an optimum branching). It is the directed analog of the minimum spanning tree problem. The algorithm was proposed independently first by Yoeng-Jin Chu and Tseng-Hong Liu (1965) and then by Jack Edmonds (1967).

== Algorithm ==
=== Description ===
The algorithm takes as input a directed graph $D = \langle V, E \rangle$ where $V$ is the set of nodes and $E$ is the set of directed edges, a distinguished vertex $r \in V$ called the root, and a real-valued weight $w(e)$ for each edge $e \in E$. It returns a spanning arborescence $A$ rooted at $r$ of minimum weight, where the weight of an arborescence is defined to be the sum of its edge weights, $w(A) = \sum_{e \in A}{w(e)}$.

The algorithm has a recursive description. Let $f(D, r, w)$ denote the function which returns a spanning arborescence rooted at $r$ of minimum weight. We first remove any edge from $E$ whose destination is $r$. We may also replace any set of parallel edges (edges between the same pair of vertices in the same direction) by a single edge with weight equal to the minimum of the weights of these parallel edges.

Now, for each node $v$ other than the root, find the edge incoming to $v$ of lowest weight (with ties broken arbitrarily). Denote the source of this edge by $\pi(v)$. If the set of edges $P = \{(\pi(v),v) \mid v \in V \setminus \{ r \} \}$ does not contain any cycles, then $f(D,r,w) = P$.

Otherwise, $P$ contains at least one cycle. Arbitrarily choose one of these cycles and call it $C$. We now define a new weighted directed graph $D^\prime = \langle V^\prime, E^\prime \rangle$ in which the cycle $C$ is "contracted" into one node as follows:

The nodes of $V^\prime$ are the nodes of $V$ not in $C$ plus a new node denoted $v_C$.

- If $(u,v)$ is an edge in $E$ with $u\notin C$ and $v\in C$ (an edge coming into the cycle), then include in $E^\prime$ a new edge $e = (u, v_C)$, and define $w^\prime(e) = w(u,v) - w(\pi(v),v)$.
- If $(u,v)$ is an edge in $E$ with $u\in C$ and $v\notin C$ (an edge going away from the cycle), then include in $E^\prime$ a new edge $e = (v_C, v)$, and define $w^\prime(e) = w(u,v)$.
- If $(u,v)$ is an edge in $E$ with $u\notin C$ and $v\notin C$ (an edge unrelated to the cycle), then include in $E^\prime$ a new edge $e = (u, v)$, and define $w^\prime(e) = w(u,v)$.

For each edge in $E^\prime$, we remember which edge in $E$ it corresponds to.

Now find a minimum spanning arborescence $A^\prime$ of $D^\prime$ using a call to $f(D^\prime, r,w^\prime)$. Since $A^\prime$ is a spanning arborescence, each vertex has exactly one incoming edge. Let $(u, v_C)$ be the unique incoming edge to $v_C$ in $A^\prime$. This edge corresponds to an edge $(u,v) \in E$ with $v \in C$. Remove the edge $(\pi(v),v)$ from $C$, breaking the cycle. Mark each remaining edge in $C$. For each edge in $A^\prime$, mark its corresponding edge in $E$. Now we define $f(D, r, w)$ to be the set of marked edges, which form a minimum spanning arborescence.

Observe that $f(D, r, w)$ is defined in terms of $f(D^\prime, r, w^\prime)$, with $D^\prime$ having strictly fewer vertices than $D$. Finding $f(D, r, w)$ for a single-vertex graph is trivial (it is just $D$ itself), so the recursive algorithm is guaranteed to terminate.

== Running time ==
The running time of this algorithm is $O(EV)$. A faster implementation of the algorithm due to Robert Tarjan runs in time $O(E \log V)$ for sparse graphs and $O(V^2)$ for dense graphs. This is as fast as Prim's algorithm for an undirected minimum spanning tree. In 1986, Gabow, Galil, Spencer, and Tarjan produced a faster implementation, with running time $O(E + V \log V)$.
