= Edmonds matrix =

In graph theory, the Edmonds matrix $A$ of a balanced bipartite graph $G = (U, V, E)$ with sets of vertices $U = \{u_1, u_2, \dots , u_n \}$ and $V = \{v_1, v_2, \dots , v_n\}$ is defined by

$$A_{ij} = \left\{ \begin{array}{ll}
x_{ij} & (u_i, v_j) \in E \\
0 & (u_i, v_j) \notin E
\end{array}\right.$$

where the x_{ij} are indeterminates. One application of the Edmonds matrix of a bipartite graph is that the graph admits a perfect matching if and only if the polynomial det(A) in the x_{ij} is not identically zero. Furthermore, the number of perfect matchings is equal to the number of monomials in the polynomial det(A), and is also equal to the permanent of $A$. In addition, the rank of $A$ is equal to the maximum matching size of $G$.

The Edmonds matrix is named after Jack Edmonds. The Tutte matrix is a generalisation to non-bipartite graphs.
