= George J. Minty =

American mathematician

George James Minty Jr. (September 16, 1929, Detroit – August 6, 1986, Bloomington, Indiana) was an American mathematician, specializing in mathematical analysis and discrete mathematics. He is known for the Klee–Minty cube, the Browder–Minty theorem, the introduction of oriented regular matroids, and the Minty-Vitaver theorem on graph coloring.

== Biography ==
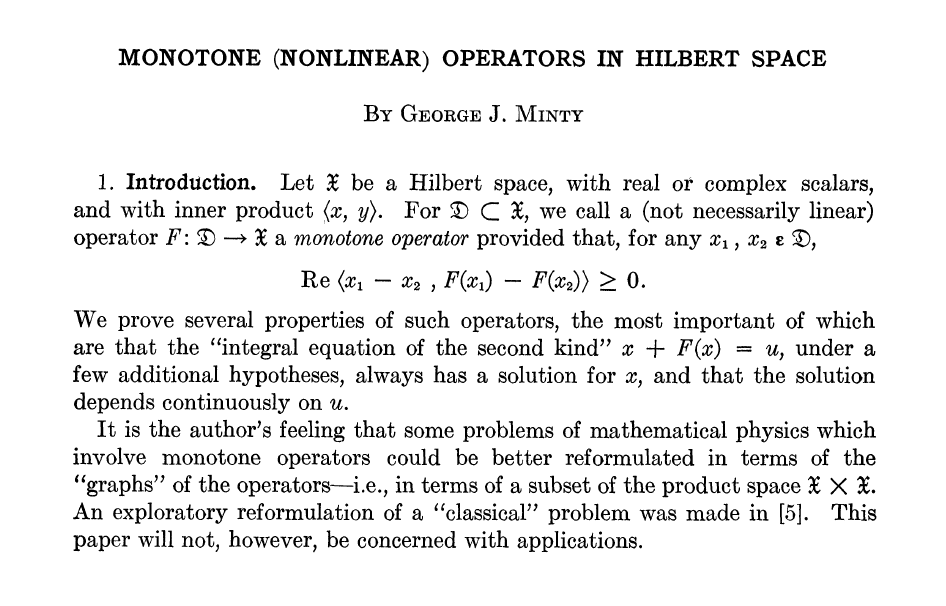
The beginning of Minty's article Monotone (nonlinear) operators in Hilbert space, published in Duke Mathematical Journal, 1962

George Minty Jr. grew up in Detroit. His father emigrated, after WW I, from Scotland to work in Detroit's automotive industry as a tool and die maker. George Minty Jr. received his bachelor's degree from Detroit's Wayne State University. After service in the US Army Signal Corps at Fort Monmouth, he became in 1956 a graduate student in mathematics at the University of Michigan. There he received in 1959 his PhD with thesis Integrability Conditions for Vector Fields in Banach Spaces supervised by Erich Rothe. As a postdoc in 1959 he was briefly a visiting researcher at Tokyo's Waseda University.

His first job out of grad school was as an applied mathematician at the General Motors Research Laboratory in Detroit, Michigan, and it was here that he first melded the discrete and the continuous to obtain significant results.

Minty joined the University of Michigan faculty and was eventually promoted to associate professor before he resigned in 1965. For the academic year 1964–1965 he was on leave to do research at the Courant Institute. In 1965 he was awarded a Sloan Research Fellowship. At Indiana University he was a full professor of mathematics from 1965 until his death in 1986.

== Research ==
Minty's 1966 paper On the axiomatic foundations of the theories of directed linear graphs, electrical networks and network-programming is important in matroid theory. In that 1966 paper, according to Dominic Welsh:

The circuit space and cocircuit space of binary matroids were introduced by Minty ... who was also the first to study orientable matriods.

According to K.-C. Chang:

The theory of monotone operators and pseudo-monotone operators attracted much attention in the 1960s and 70s. The works of Minty ..., Browder ..., Hartman and Stampacchia ..., H. Brezis ..., etc. constitute the basic content of the theory.

In 2012 D. Erdős, A. Frank, and K. Kun published a sharpening of Minty's coloring theorem (published in 1962 in The American Mathematical Monthly).

== Selected publications ==
- Minty, G. J. (1960). "Monotone networks". Proceedings of the Royal Society of London. Series A. Mathematical and Physical Sciences. 257 (1289): 194–212. Bibcode:1960RSPSA.257..194M. doi:10.1098/rspa.1960.0144. ISSN 0080-4630. S2CID 202574544.
- Minty, George J. (1962). "Monotone (nonlinear) operators in Hilbert space". Duke Math. J. 29 (3): 341–346. doi:10.1215/S0012-7094-62-02933-2.
- Minty, George J. (1962). "On the simultaneous solution of a certain system of linear inequalities". Proceedings of the American Mathematical Society. 13: 11. doi:10.1090/S0002-9939-1962-0143006-9. MR 0143006.
- Minty, George J. (1962). "A Theorem on n-Coloring the Points of a Linear Graph". The American Mathematical Monthly. 69 (7): 623–624. doi:10.1080/00029890.1962.11989938. ISSN 0002-9890.
- Minty, George J. (1963). "Two theorems on nonlinear functional equations in Hilbert space". Bulletin of the American Mathematical Society. 69 (5): 691–693. doi:10.1090/S0002-9904-1963-10986-6.
- Minty, G. J. (1963). "On a "monotonicity" method for the solution of nonlinear equations in Banach spaces". Proceedings of the National Academy of Sciences. 50 (6): 1038–1041. Bibcode:1963PNAS...50.1038M. doi:10.1073/pnas.50.6.1038. ISSN 0027-8424. PMC 221269. PMID 16578554.
- Minty, George J. (1965). "A theorem on maximal monotonic sets in Hilbert space". Journal of Mathematical Analysis and Applications. 11: 434–439. doi:10.1016/0022-247X(65)90095-8. hdl:2027.42/32073.
- Minty, George J. (1966). "On the axiomatic foundations of the theories of directed linear graphs, electrical networks and network-programming". Journal of Mathematics and Mechanics. 15 (3): 485–520. JSTOR 24901346. MR 0188102.
- Minty, George J. (1967). "A theorem on three-coloring the edges of a trivalent graph" (PDF). Journal of Combinatorial Theory. 2 (2): 164–167. doi:10.1016/S0021-9800(67)80097-8.
- Minty, George J. (1967). "On the generalization of a direct method of the calculus of variations". Bulletin of the American Mathematical Society. 73 (3): 315–322. doi:10.1090/S0002-9904-1967-11732-4. MR 0212631.
- Minty, George J. (1970). "On the extension of Lipschitz, Lipschitz-Hölder continuous, and monotone functions". Bulletin of the American Mathematical Society. 76 (2): 334–340. doi:10.1090/S0002-9904-1970-12466-1. MR 0254575.
- Shisha, Oved, ed. (1972). "How good is the simplex algorithm? by Victor Klee and George Minty". Inequalities III (Proceedings of the Third Symposium on Inequalities held at the University of California, Los Angeles, Calif., September 1–9, 1969, dedicated to the memory of Theodore S. Motzkin). New York-London: Academic Press. pp. 159–175. MR 0332165.
  - Abstract of How good is the simplex method?
- Minty, George J. (1974). "A "from scratch" proof of a theorem of Rockafellar and Fulkerson". Mathematical Programming. 7: 368–375. doi:10.1007/BF01585531. S2CID 1504975.
- Minty, George J. (1974). "A finite-dimensional tool-theorem in monotone operator theory" (PDF). Advances in Mathematics. 12 (1): 1–7. doi:10.1016/S0001-8708(74)80015-0.
- Minty, George J. (1978). "On variational inequalities for monotone operators, I" (PDF). Advances in Mathematics. 30 (1): 1–7. doi:10.1016/0001-8708(78)90128-7.
- Minty, George J. (1980). "On maximal independent sets of vertices in claw-free graphs". Journal of Combinatorial Theory. Series B. 28 (3): 284–304. doi:10.1016/0095-8956(80)90074-X.
