= Hildegard Rothe-Ille =

German mathematician (1899–1942)

Hildegard Rothe-Ille, born Hildegard Ille, (1899–1942), was a German mathematician.

== Career ==
She was one of Issai Schur’s doctoral students. According to Alexander Soifer, “Van der Waerden walked away from Ramseyan prehistory. Issai Schur, on the other hand, continued to produce Ramseyan mathematics, and moreover directed and inspired his PhD students Richard Rado, Hildegard Ille and Alfred Brauer to do the same.”

She received her doctorate in mathematics in 1924. Beginning on April 1, 1925, she was a year-long scholarship holder at the Kaiser Wilhelm Institute for Physics, which was headed by Albert Einstein at the time. She was the only woman to receive a scholarship from that institute in that academic year, and she received a higher scholarship than her male counterparts did.

She taught at the Chamisso school in Berlin-Schöneberg from 1926 until 1928. After marrying in 1928, due to German law she was not allowed to work for pay; however, she did review papers about mathematics. Under the name Hildegard Rothe she reviewed 40 papers which had been published between 1926 and 1928, and under the name Hildegard Rothe-Ille she reviewed 129 papers which had been published between 1930 and 1937.

The 1940 United States census records that she was a part-time teacher of German at William Penn College.

== Publications ==
- “Zur Irreduzibilität der Kugelfunktionen”. Dissertation, 1924
- “Einige Bemerkungen zu einem von G. Pólya herrührenden Irreduzibilitätskriterium”. In: Annual report of the German Mathematical Society. Volume 35, 1926, pages 204–208

== Personal life ==
Her parents were Agnes Clara Bertha Thurm and Otto Friedrich Carl Ille. Otto died in 1900.

She married Erich Rothe in 1928. In Breslau in April 1931 she gave birth to Erhard W. Rothe.

She and Erich and their son Erhard left Nazi Germany and arrived in Zürich in 1937. Erich went to the United States after this, and Hildegard and Erhard followed in 1938.
