= Erich Rothe =

German-born American mathematician

Erich Hans Rothe
- Born: July 21, 1895; Berlin, German Empire
- Died: February 19, 1988 (aged 92); Ann Arbor, Michigan, United States
- Education: Technische Hochschule Berlin (PhD, 1927)
- Known for: Rothe method, Rothe's fixed point theorem, results in degree theory
- Spouse: Hildegard Ille (m. 1928)
- Children: Erhard W. Rothe
- Scientific career
- Fields: Mathematical analysis, differential equations, integral equations, mathematical physics
- Doctoral advisor: Erhard Schmidt, Richard von Mises
- Doctoral students: Jane Cronin Scanlon, George J. Minty

Erich Hans Rothe (July 21, 1895, Berlin – February 19, 1988, Ann Arbor, Michigan) was a German-born American mathematician, who did research in mathematical analysis, differential equations, integral equations, and mathematical physics. He is known for the Rothe method (also known as the method of lines or the method of semidiscretization) used for solving evolution equations.

== Biography ==
Rothe, whose father was a lawyer, attended Berlin's Royal Wilhelm Gymnasium and passed his Abitur in October 1913. After completing two semesters at the Ludwig-Maximilians-Universität München, he volunteered to join the German Army in a field artillery regiment. He was wounded in the Battle of Verdun and was discharged from the German Army in December 1918. In 1919, he continued his mathematical studies for one semester at Technische Hochschule Berlin and then transferred to the Friedrich Wilhelm University of Berlin. There he studied mathematics, physics, and philosophy and in 1923 passed the Lehramtsexamen qualifying him to become a Gymnasium teacher. From 1923 to 1926, he taught at Berlin's Mommsen-Gymnasium. In 1927, he received his Promotion from Technische Hochschule Berlin. His dissertation Über einige Analogien zwischen linearen partiellen und linearen gewöhnlichen Differentialgleichungen (About some analogies between linear partial and linear ordinary differential equations) was supervised by Erhard Schmidt and Richard von Mises. Rothe worked from 1926 to 1927 at the Institute of Applied Mathematics of the Friedrich Wilhelm University of Berlin. In 1928, he married the mathematician Hildegard Ille (1899–1942). From 1928 to 1931, he was a Privatdozent and Assistent under Fritz Noether at the Technische Hochschule Breslau. There he received his Habilitation in 1928. From 1931 to 1935, he was a Privatdozent at the University of Breslau. There he received his Umhabilitation in 1931). During the time he held positions in Breslau, he took study leave for a year at the University of Göttingen. In Breslau in April 1931, Hildegard Rothe gave birth to Erhard W. Rothe.

After being dismissed in 1935 from the German civil service because he was a Jew, Rothe with his wife and son escaped to Zurich and emigrated in 1937 to the USA. From 1937 to 1943, he taught mathematics (with a very small salary) at William Penn College in Oskaloosa, Iowa. His wife died of cancer in December 1942. At the University of Michigan, Rothe was an assistant professor from 1944 to 1949, an associate professor from 1949 to 1955, and a full professor from 1955 to 1964, when he retired as professor emeritus. In retirement, he taught at the University of Michigan–Dearborn and in the academic year from 1967 to 1968 at Western Michigan University (WMU). During his year at WMU, Rothe helped to develop the PhD program for WMU's mathematics department, which awarded its first PhD in December 1969.

Rothe published more than 50 mathematical papers. He was a co-author, with Hans Rademacher, of chapter 19 of the 7th edition of Die Differential- und Integralgleichungen der Mechanik und Physik. In 1986 at the age of 91, Rothe published the 242-page book Introduction to Various Aspects of Degree Theory in Banach Spaces.

In addition to the Rothe Method, he is also known for his theorem, proven in 1937, that a functional in a Hilbert space is weakly continuous if and only if its Fréchet derivative is a completely continuous operator and for Rothe's fixed point theorem, proven in 1937. In 1978 a collection of papers was published in his honor. His doctoral students include Jane Cronin Scanlon and George J. Minty.

Upon his death, Erich Rothe was survived by his son and two granddaughters.

== Selected publications ==
- Rothe, E. H. (1946). "Gradient Mappings in Hilbert Space". Annals of Mathematics. 47 (3): 580–592. doi:10.2307/1969094. JSTOR 1969094.
- —— (1948). "Completely Continuous Scalars and Variational Methods". Annals of Mathematics. 49 (2): 265–278. doi:10.2307/1969277. JSTOR 1969277.
- —— (1948). "Gradient mappings and extrema in Banach spaces". Duke Mathematical Journal. 15 (2): 421–431. doi:10.1215/S0012-7094-48-01540-3. ISSN 0012-7094.
- —— (1949). "Weak Topology and Nonlinear Integral Equations". Transactions of the American Mathematical Society. 66 (1): 75–92. doi:10.2307/1990549. JSTOR 1990549.
- —— (1950). "A relation between the type numbers of a critical point and the index of the corresponding field of gradient vectors. Erhard Schmidt zum 75. Geburtstag gewidmet". Mathematische Nachrichten. 4 (1–6): 12–27. doi:10.1002/mana.3210040103.
- —— (1951). "Critical points and gradient fields of scalars in Hilbert space". Acta Mathematica. 85: 73–98. doi:10.1007/BF02395742.
- —— (1952). "Leray-Schauder Index and Morse Type Numbers in Hilbert Space". Annals of Mathematics. 55 (3): 433–467. doi:10.2307/1969643. JSTOR 1969643.
- —— (1952). "A Remark on Isolated Critical Points". American Journal of Mathematics. 74 (1): 253–263. doi:10.2307/2372083. JSTOR 2372083.
- —— (1953). "A note on the Banach spaces of Calkin and Morrey" (PDF). Pacific J. Math. 3 (2): 493–499. doi:10.2140/pjm.1953.3.493.
- —— (1953). "Gradient mappings". Bulletin of the American Mathematical Society. 59: 5–20. doi:10.1090/S0002-9904-1953-09649-5.
- —— (1956). "Remarks on the application of gradient mappings to the calculus of variations and the connected boundary value problems in partial differential equations". Communications on Pure and Applied Mathematics. 9 (3): 551–568. doi:10.1002/cpa.3160090325.
- —— (1959). "A Note on Gradient Mappings". Proceedings of the American Mathematical Society. 10 (6): 931–935. doi:10.2307/2033624. JSTOR 2033624.
- —— (1965). "Critical point theory in Hilbert space under general boundary conditions" (PDF). Journal of Mathematical Analysis and Applications. 11: 357–409. doi:10.1016/0022-247X(65)90092-2. hdl:2027.42/32071.
- —— (1966). "An existence theorem in the calculus of variations based on Sobolev's imbedding theorems". Arch. Rational Mech. Analysis. 21 (2): 151–162. doi:10.1007/BF00266572. hdl:2027.42/46175. S2CID 30858816.
- —— (1971). "Critical point theory in Hilbert space under regular boundary conditions" (PDF). Journal of Mathematical Analysis and Applications. 36 (2): 377–431. doi:10.1016/0022-247X(71)90010-2.
- —— (1973). "Morse Theory in Hilbert Space". The Rocky Mountain Journal of Mathematics. 3 (2): 251–274. doi:10.1216/RMJ-1973-3-2-251. JSTOR 44236313.
- —— (1975). "A generalization of the Seifert-Threlfall proof for the Lusternik-Schnirelman category inequality" (PDF). Journal of Mathematical Analysis and Applications. 50 (2): 243–267. doi:10.1016/0022-247X(75)90020-7.
- Introduction to Various Aspects of Degree Theory in Banach Spaces. Mathematical Surveys and Monographs. Vol. 23. Providence, Rhode Island: American Mathematical Society. 1986. ISBN 9780821827703.
