= Browder–Minty theorem =

In mathematics, the Browder–Minty theorem (sometimes called the Minty–Browder theorem) states that a bounded, continuous, coercive and monotone function T from a real, separable reflexive Banach space X into its continuous dual space X^{∗} is automatically surjective. That is, for each continuous linear functional g ∈ X^{∗}, there exists a solution u ∈ X of the equation T(u) = g. (Note that T itself is not required to be a linear map.)

The theorem is named in honor of Felix Browder and George J. Minty, who independently proved it.

== See also ==
- Pseudo-monotone operator; pseudo-monotone operators obey a near-exact analogue of the Browder–Minty theorem.
