= William R. Pulleyblank =

Canadian-American operations researcher

William R. Pulleyblank is a Canadian and American operations researcher. He is a professor of operations research at the United States Military Academy (West Point), where he also holds the Class of 1950 Chair of Advanced Technology.

== Education and career ==
Pulleyblank obtained his Ph.D. from the University of Waterloo in 1973; his thesis, supervised by Jack Edmonds, concerned perfect matching theory from the point of view of polyhedral combinatorics. He worked at IBM beginning in the late 1960s and then returned to academia in 1974, as a professor at the University of Calgary, before moving back to Waterloo in 1982. At Waterloo, he held the CP/NSERC Chair of Optimization and Computer Applications. In 1990 he began a second stint at IBM, where his work included leading the Blue Gene project. He was promoted to vice president in 2004, and retired from IBM in 2010, at which time he joined the West Point faculty.

== Awards and honors ==
In 1998 he was an Invited Speaker of the International Congress of Mathematicians in Berlin. The College of Saint Rose, in Albany, New York, and McMaster University, in Ontario, Canada, have both given Pulleyblank honorary degrees. He is also a recipient of the Alberta Centennial Medal, a fellow of INFORMS, and (since 2010) a member of the National Academy of Engineering.
