= Jane Cronin Scanlon =

American mathematician (1922–2018)

- Born: July 17, 1922; Manhattan
- Died: June 19, 2018 (aged 95)
- Education: University of Michigan
- Spouse: Joseph Scanlon
- Children: 4
- Scientific career
- Fields: Mathematics
- Workplaces: Rutgers University
- Thesis: (1949)
- Doctoral advisors: Erich Rothe

Jane Smiley Cronin Scanlon (July 17, 1922 – June 19, 2018) was an American mathematician and an emeritus professor of mathematics at Rutgers University. Her research concerned partial differential equations and mathematical biology.

== Education and career ==
Scanlon earned a bachelor's degree in mathematics from Wayne University (now Wayne State University). She completed her Ph.D. in mathematics at the University of Michigan in 1949, under the supervision of Erich Rothe. Her dissertation was Branch Points of Solutions of Equations in Banach Space.

After working for the United States Air Force and the American Optical Company, she returned to academia as a lecturer at Wheaton College (Massachusetts) and then Stonehill College. She moved to the Polytechnic Institute of Brooklyn in 1957, and to Rutgers in 1965. In 1974 Scanlon was elected as an AMS Member at Large and held the position until 1976. She retired in 1991. During her twenty-six years at Rutgers, she supervised seven doctoral students.

She died in June 2018 at the age of 95.

== Recognition ==
Scanlon was a Noether Lecturer in 1985, and Pi Mu Epsilon J. Sutherland Frame Lecturer in 1989. Her talks concerned "entrainment of frequency" and the application of this principle to mathematical models of the Purkinje fibers in the heart. In 2012, she became one of the inaugural fellows of the American Mathematical Society.

== Personal life ==
She married the physicist Joseph Scanlon in 1953. The two divorced in 1979. Upon her death, she was survived by four children and seven grandchildren.

== Selected publications ==
=== Articles ===
- Cronin, Jane (1950). "The existence of multiple [sic] solutions of elliptic differential equations". Transactions of the American Mathematical Society. 68: 105–131. doi:10.1090/S0002-9947-1950-0032891-3.
- —— (1950). "Branch points of solutions of equations in Banach space". Transactions of the American Mathematical Society. 69 (2): 208–231. doi:10.1090/S0002-9947-1950-0040578-6. hdl:2027.42/182251.
- —— (1953). "Analytic Functional Mappings". Annals of Mathematics. 58 (1): 175–181. doi:10.2307/1969827. JSTOR 1969827.
- —— (1954). "Branch points of solutions of equations in Banach space. II". Transactions of the American Mathematical Society. 76 (2): 207–222. doi:10.1090/S0002-9947-1954-0062949-8.
- —— (1956). "Some mappings with topological degree zero". Proceedings of the American Mathematical Society. 7 (6): 1139–1145. doi:10.1090/S0002-9939-1956-0083724-1.
- —— (1961). "Families of solutions of a perturbation problem". Proceedings of the American Mathematical Society. 12: 84–91. doi:10.1090/S0002-9939-1961-0131017-8.
- ——; Richards, Paul B.; Russell, Lawrence H. (1964). "Some periodic solutions of a four-body problem". Icarus. 3 (5–6): 423–428. Bibcode:1964Icar....3..423C. doi:10.1016/0019-1035(64)90003-X.
- ——; McAuley, L. F. (1966). "Whyburn's conjecture for some differentiable maps". Proceedings of the National Academy of Sciences. 56 (2): 405–412. Bibcode:1966PNAS...56..405C. doi:10.1073/pnas.56.2.405. ISSN 0027-8424. PMC 224386. PMID 16591368.
- —— (1971). "Quasilinear systems with several periodic solutions". Proceedings of the American Mathematical Society. 30: 107–111. doi:10.1090/S0002-9939-1971-0280803-9.
- —— (1973). "Equations with bounded nonlinearities" (PDF). Journal of Differential Equations. 14 (3): 581–596. Bibcode:1973JDE....14..581C. doi:10.1016/0022-0396(73)90069-7.
- —— (1973). "Biomathematical model of aneurysm of the circle of Willis: A aqualitative analysis of the differential equation of Austin". Mathematical Biosciences. 16 (3–4): 209–225. doi:10.1016/0025-5564(73)90031-X.
- —— (1977). "Some Mathematics of Biological Oscillations". SIAM Review. 19: 100–138. doi:10.1137/1019007.

=== Books ===
- Advanced Calculus, Boston, Heath 1967
- Differential equations: Introduction and Qualitative Theory, Dekker 1980, 2nd edition 1994, 3rd edition CRC/Chapman and Hall 2008
- Fixed points and topological degrees in nonlinear analysis, American Mathematical Society 1964; 1995 pbk edition of 1972 reprint with corrections
- Mathematical aspects of the Hodgkin-Huxley neural theory, Cambridge University Press 1987
- Mathematics of Cell Electrophysiology, Dekker 1981

=== as editor ===
- Cronin, Jane; O'Malley Jr., Robert E., eds. (1999). Analyzing Multiscale Phenomena Using Singular Perturbation Methods: American Mathematical Society Short Course, January 5-6, 1998, Baltimore, Maryland. American Mathematical Soc. ISBN 978-0-8218-0929-7.
