= 0/1-polytope =

Type of convex polytope

A 0/1-polytope is a convex polytope generated by the convex hull of a subset of d coordinates value 0 or 1, {0,1}^{d}. The full domain is the unit hypercube with cut hyperplanes passing through these coordinates. A d-polytope requires at least d + 1 vertices, and can't be all in the same hyperplanes.

n-simplex polytopes for example can be generated n + 1 vertices, using the origin, and one vertex along each primary axis, (1,0....), etc. Every simple 0/1-polytope is a Cartesian product of 0/1 simplexes.
