= Khachiyan =

Khachiyan (Armenian: Խաչիյան; Russian: Хачия́н) is an Armenian surname. Notable people with this surname include:

- Anna Khachiyan (born 1985), American writer and podcaster
- Leonid Khachiyan (1952–2015), Soviet-American mathematician and computer scientist
- Melikset Khachiyan (born 1970), Armenian-American chess grandmaster
