= Victor Klee =

American mathematician (1925–2007)

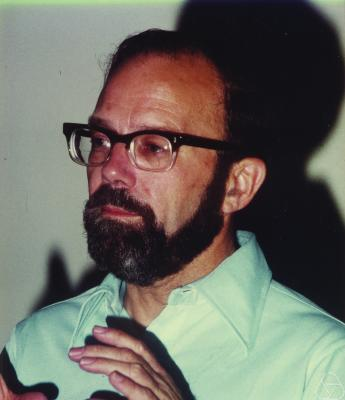
- Born: September 18, 1925; San Francisco, California, U.S.
- Died: August 17, 2007 (aged 81); Lakewood, Ohio, U.S.
- Education: Pomona College; University of Virginia (Ph.D.)
- Known for: Kleetope; Klee–Minty cube; Klee's measure problem; Algebraic Combinatorics; g-Theorem; Computational Convexity; Hadwiger-Danzer–Grünbaum–Klee
- Awards: Lester R. Ford Award (1972); Sloan Fellowship (1972); Guggenheim Fellowship (1972); Allendoerfer Award (1980, 1999); Max Planck Research Award (1992); American Academy of Arts and Sciences (1997)
- Scientific career
- Fields: Mathematics
- Institutions: University of Washington
- Thesis: Convex Sets in Linear Spaces (1949)
- Doctoral advisor: Edward James McShane
- Doctoral students: Bernd Sturmfels; Robert Phelps

Victor LaRue Klee, Jr. (September 18, 1925 – August 17, 2007) was a mathematician specialising in convex sets, functional analysis, analysis of algorithms, optimization, and combinatorics. He spent almost his entire career at the University of Washington in Seattle.

== Life ==
Born in San Francisco, Klee earned his B.A. degree in 1945 with high honors from Pomona College, majoring in mathematics and chemistry. He did his graduate studies, including a thesis titled Convex Sets in Linear Spaces, and received his PhD in mathematics from the University of Virginia in 1949. After teaching for several years at the University of Virginia, he moved in 1953 to the University of Washington in Seattle, Washington, where he was a faculty member for 54 years. He died in Lakewood, Ohio.

== Research ==
Klee wrote more than 240 research papers. He proposed Klee's measure problem and the art gallery problem. Kleetopes are also named after him, as is the Klee–Minty cube, which shows that the simplex algorithm for linear programming does not work in polynomial time in the worst case.

== Service and recognition ==
Klee served as president of the Mathematical Association of America from 1971 to 1973. In 1972 he won a Lester R. Ford Award. In 1977, the MAA recognized Klee by presenting him with their Award for Distinguished Service to Mathematics.
