= Pseudo-monotone operator =

In mathematics, a pseudo-monotone operator from a reflexive Banach space into its continuous dual space is one that is, in some sense, almost as well-behaved as a monotone operator. Many problems in the calculus of variations can be expressed using operators that are pseudo-monotone, and pseudo-monotonicity in turn implies the existence of solutions to these problems.

== Definition ==
Let (X, || ||) be a reflexive Banach space. A map T : X → X^{∗} from X into its continuous dual space X^{∗} is said to be pseudo-monotone if T is a bounded operator (not necessarily continuous) and if whenever

$$u_{j} \rightharpoonup u \mbox{ in } X \mbox{ as } j \to \infty$$

(i.e. u_{j} converges weakly to u) and

$$\limsup_{j \to \infty} \langle T(u_{j}), u_{j} - u \rangle \leq 0,$$

it follows that, for all v ∈ X,

$$\liminf_{j \to \infty} \langle T(u_{j}), u_{j} - v \rangle \geq \langle T(u), u - v \rangle.$$

== Properties of pseudo-monotone operators ==
Using a very similar proof to that of the Browder–Minty theorem, one can show the following:

Let (X, || ||) be a real, reflexive Banach space and suppose that T : X → X^{∗} is bounded, coercive and pseudo-monotone. Then, for each continuous linear functional g ∈ X^{∗}, there exists a solution u ∈ X of the equation T(u) = g.
